

258001–258100 

|-bgcolor=#d6d6d6
| 258001 ||  || — || March 18, 2001 || Kitt Peak || Spacewatch || — || align=right | 4.1 km || 
|-id=002 bgcolor=#fefefe
| 258002 ||  || — || March 19, 2001 || Anderson Mesa || LONEOS || V || align=right data-sort-value="0.97" | 970 m || 
|-id=003 bgcolor=#fefefe
| 258003 ||  || — || March 18, 2001 || Socorro || LINEAR || — || align=right | 1.5 km || 
|-id=004 bgcolor=#fefefe
| 258004 ||  || — || March 19, 2001 || Socorro || LINEAR || MAS || align=right | 1.2 km || 
|-id=005 bgcolor=#d6d6d6
| 258005 ||  || — || March 18, 2001 || Socorro || LINEAR || EUP || align=right | 6.0 km || 
|-id=006 bgcolor=#fefefe
| 258006 ||  || — || March 21, 2001 || Anderson Mesa || LONEOS || — || align=right | 1.3 km || 
|-id=007 bgcolor=#d6d6d6
| 258007 ||  || — || March 24, 2001 || Haleakala || NEAT || — || align=right | 4.9 km || 
|-id=008 bgcolor=#fefefe
| 258008 ||  || — || March 19, 2001 || Socorro || LINEAR || — || align=right | 1.1 km || 
|-id=009 bgcolor=#fefefe
| 258009 ||  || — || March 19, 2001 || Socorro || LINEAR || NYS || align=right data-sort-value="0.82" | 820 m || 
|-id=010 bgcolor=#d6d6d6
| 258010 ||  || — || March 19, 2001 || Socorro || LINEAR || — || align=right | 6.0 km || 
|-id=011 bgcolor=#fefefe
| 258011 ||  || — || March 19, 2001 || Socorro || LINEAR || — || align=right data-sort-value="0.99" | 990 m || 
|-id=012 bgcolor=#E9E9E9
| 258012 ||  || — || March 23, 2001 || Socorro || LINEAR || — || align=right | 1.5 km || 
|-id=013 bgcolor=#d6d6d6
| 258013 ||  || — || March 26, 2001 || Kitt Peak || Spacewatch || — || align=right | 3.4 km || 
|-id=014 bgcolor=#fefefe
| 258014 ||  || — || March 26, 2001 || Kitt Peak || Spacewatch || NYS || align=right data-sort-value="0.92" | 920 m || 
|-id=015 bgcolor=#fefefe
| 258015 ||  || — || March 19, 2001 || Anderson Mesa || LONEOS || NYS || align=right data-sort-value="0.95" | 950 m || 
|-id=016 bgcolor=#fefefe
| 258016 ||  || — || March 26, 2001 || Socorro || LINEAR || — || align=right | 1.1 km || 
|-id=017 bgcolor=#fefefe
| 258017 ||  || — || March 26, 2001 || Socorro || LINEAR || — || align=right | 3.7 km || 
|-id=018 bgcolor=#d6d6d6
| 258018 ||  || — || March 20, 2001 || Haleakala || NEAT || EOS || align=right | 3.1 km || 
|-id=019 bgcolor=#fefefe
| 258019 ||  || — || March 21, 2001 || Haleakala || NEAT || H || align=right data-sort-value="0.77" | 770 m || 
|-id=020 bgcolor=#d6d6d6
| 258020 ||  || — || March 23, 2001 || Anderson Mesa || LONEOS || — || align=right | 4.5 km || 
|-id=021 bgcolor=#d6d6d6
| 258021 ||  || — || March 24, 2001 || Anderson Mesa || LONEOS || — || align=right | 4.5 km || 
|-id=022 bgcolor=#fefefe
| 258022 ||  || — || March 24, 2001 || Kitt Peak || Spacewatch || — || align=right | 1.0 km || 
|-id=023 bgcolor=#fefefe
| 258023 ||  || — || March 25, 2001 || Powell || Powell Obs. || — || align=right | 1.3 km || 
|-id=024 bgcolor=#d6d6d6
| 258024 ||  || — || March 29, 2001 || Anderson Mesa || LONEOS || — || align=right | 6.3 km || 
|-id=025 bgcolor=#fefefe
| 258025 ||  || — || March 22, 2001 || Kitt Peak || Spacewatch || — || align=right | 1.1 km || 
|-id=026 bgcolor=#E9E9E9
| 258026 ||  || — || April 15, 2001 || Prescott || P. G. Comba || — || align=right | 1.4 km || 
|-id=027 bgcolor=#E9E9E9
| 258027 ||  || — || April 17, 2001 || Socorro || LINEAR || JUN || align=right | 1.4 km || 
|-id=028 bgcolor=#E9E9E9
| 258028 ||  || — || April 24, 2001 || Kitt Peak || Spacewatch || — || align=right | 1.1 km || 
|-id=029 bgcolor=#d6d6d6
| 258029 ||  || — || April 26, 2001 || Socorro || LINEAR || — || align=right | 6.2 km || 
|-id=030 bgcolor=#E9E9E9
| 258030 ||  || — || April 27, 2001 || Socorro || LINEAR || — || align=right | 2.1 km || 
|-id=031 bgcolor=#fefefe
| 258031 ||  || — || April 16, 2001 || Socorro || LINEAR || — || align=right data-sort-value="0.99" | 990 m || 
|-id=032 bgcolor=#fefefe
| 258032 ||  || — || April 26, 2001 || Anderson Mesa || LONEOS || H || align=right data-sort-value="0.76" | 760 m || 
|-id=033 bgcolor=#d6d6d6
| 258033 ||  || — || April 27, 2001 || Kitt Peak || Spacewatch || ALA || align=right | 6.3 km || 
|-id=034 bgcolor=#fefefe
| 258034 ||  || — || April 26, 2001 || Anderson Mesa || LONEOS || PHO || align=right | 1.2 km || 
|-id=035 bgcolor=#fefefe
| 258035 ||  || — || May 15, 2001 || Anderson Mesa || LONEOS || — || align=right | 1.1 km || 
|-id=036 bgcolor=#fefefe
| 258036 ||  || — || May 15, 2001 || Anderson Mesa || LONEOS || — || align=right | 1.1 km || 
|-id=037 bgcolor=#fefefe
| 258037 ||  || — || May 21, 2001 || Socorro || LINEAR || NYS || align=right data-sort-value="0.90" | 900 m || 
|-id=038 bgcolor=#fefefe
| 258038 ||  || — || May 22, 2001 || Socorro || LINEAR || — || align=right | 1.3 km || 
|-id=039 bgcolor=#fefefe
| 258039 ||  || — || May 23, 2001 || Socorro || LINEAR || H || align=right data-sort-value="0.85" | 850 m || 
|-id=040 bgcolor=#d6d6d6
| 258040 ||  || — || May 22, 2001 || Socorro || LINEAR || EUP || align=right | 7.4 km || 
|-id=041 bgcolor=#E9E9E9
| 258041 ||  || — || May 23, 2001 || Kitt Peak || Spacewatch || — || align=right | 1.6 km || 
|-id=042 bgcolor=#fefefe
| 258042 ||  || — || May 29, 2001 || Haleakala || NEAT || NYS || align=right | 1.1 km || 
|-id=043 bgcolor=#fefefe
| 258043 ||  || — || June 22, 2001 || Palomar || NEAT || H || align=right data-sort-value="0.92" | 920 m || 
|-id=044 bgcolor=#E9E9E9
| 258044 ||  || — || June 17, 2001 || Kitt Peak || Spacewatch || JUN || align=right | 1.3 km || 
|-id=045 bgcolor=#E9E9E9
| 258045 ||  || — || June 21, 2001 || Palomar || NEAT || — || align=right | 2.3 km || 
|-id=046 bgcolor=#E9E9E9
| 258046 ||  || — || July 12, 2001 || Palomar || NEAT || — || align=right | 1.9 km || 
|-id=047 bgcolor=#E9E9E9
| 258047 ||  || — || July 10, 2001 || Palomar || NEAT || — || align=right | 1.6 km || 
|-id=048 bgcolor=#E9E9E9
| 258048 ||  || — || July 13, 2001 || Palomar || NEAT || — || align=right | 1.6 km || 
|-id=049 bgcolor=#d6d6d6
| 258049 ||  || — || July 14, 2001 || Palomar || NEAT || Tj (2.94) || align=right | 4.8 km || 
|-id=050 bgcolor=#E9E9E9
| 258050 ||  || — || July 14, 2001 || Haleakala || NEAT || — || align=right | 1.9 km || 
|-id=051 bgcolor=#FA8072
| 258051 ||  || — || July 12, 2001 || Socorro || LINEAR || — || align=right | 2.5 km || 
|-id=052 bgcolor=#E9E9E9
| 258052 ||  || — || July 13, 2001 || Palomar || NEAT || — || align=right | 5.6 km || 
|-id=053 bgcolor=#E9E9E9
| 258053 ||  || — || July 14, 2001 || Palomar || NEAT || — || align=right | 1.7 km || 
|-id=054 bgcolor=#E9E9E9
| 258054 ||  || — || July 14, 2001 || Palomar || NEAT || — || align=right | 2.1 km || 
|-id=055 bgcolor=#E9E9E9
| 258055 ||  || — || July 17, 2001 || Anderson Mesa || LONEOS || — || align=right | 3.4 km || 
|-id=056 bgcolor=#E9E9E9
| 258056 ||  || — || July 17, 2001 || Haleakala || NEAT || — || align=right | 2.0 km || 
|-id=057 bgcolor=#E9E9E9
| 258057 ||  || — || July 21, 2001 || Anderson Mesa || LONEOS || JUN || align=right | 1.6 km || 
|-id=058 bgcolor=#E9E9E9
| 258058 ||  || — || July 19, 2001 || Palomar || NEAT || — || align=right | 2.9 km || 
|-id=059 bgcolor=#E9E9E9
| 258059 ||  || — || July 23, 2001 || Palomar || NEAT || — || align=right | 3.8 km || 
|-id=060 bgcolor=#E9E9E9
| 258060 ||  || — || July 16, 2001 || Haleakala || NEAT || ADE || align=right | 2.8 km || 
|-id=061 bgcolor=#E9E9E9
| 258061 ||  || — || July 20, 2001 || Palomar || NEAT || — || align=right | 3.1 km || 
|-id=062 bgcolor=#E9E9E9
| 258062 ||  || — || July 21, 2001 || Palomar || NEAT || — || align=right | 1.8 km || 
|-id=063 bgcolor=#E9E9E9
| 258063 ||  || — || July 21, 2001 || Palomar || NEAT || — || align=right | 4.0 km || 
|-id=064 bgcolor=#E9E9E9
| 258064 ||  || — || July 22, 2001 || Palomar || NEAT || — || align=right | 1.7 km || 
|-id=065 bgcolor=#E9E9E9
| 258065 ||  || — || July 22, 2001 || Palomar || NEAT || JUN || align=right | 1.5 km || 
|-id=066 bgcolor=#E9E9E9
| 258066 ||  || — || July 16, 2001 || Anderson Mesa || LONEOS || — || align=right | 2.5 km || 
|-id=067 bgcolor=#E9E9E9
| 258067 ||  || — || July 23, 2001 || Haleakala || NEAT || — || align=right | 1.9 km || 
|-id=068 bgcolor=#E9E9E9
| 258068 ||  || — || July 19, 2001 || Anderson Mesa || LONEOS || — || align=right | 3.3 km || 
|-id=069 bgcolor=#E9E9E9
| 258069 ||  || — || July 21, 2001 || Anderson Mesa || LONEOS || IAN || align=right | 1.6 km || 
|-id=070 bgcolor=#E9E9E9
| 258070 ||  || — || July 27, 2001 || Anderson Mesa || LONEOS || — || align=right | 1.8 km || 
|-id=071 bgcolor=#E9E9E9
| 258071 ||  || — || July 29, 2001 || Anderson Mesa || LONEOS || JUN || align=right | 2.1 km || 
|-id=072 bgcolor=#E9E9E9
| 258072 ||  || — || July 27, 2001 || Palomar || NEAT || JUN || align=right | 1.2 km || 
|-id=073 bgcolor=#E9E9E9
| 258073 ||  || — || August 3, 2001 || Haleakala || NEAT || — || align=right | 2.4 km || 
|-id=074 bgcolor=#E9E9E9
| 258074 ||  || — || August 8, 2001 || Haleakala || NEAT || — || align=right | 1.6 km || 
|-id=075 bgcolor=#E9E9E9
| 258075 ||  || — || August 8, 2001 || Haleakala || NEAT || ADE || align=right | 2.5 km || 
|-id=076 bgcolor=#E9E9E9
| 258076 ||  || — || August 10, 2001 || Palomar || NEAT || — || align=right | 2.0 km || 
|-id=077 bgcolor=#E9E9E9
| 258077 ||  || — || August 9, 2001 || Palomar || NEAT || — || align=right | 2.0 km || 
|-id=078 bgcolor=#E9E9E9
| 258078 ||  || — || August 10, 2001 || Haleakala || NEAT || MAR || align=right | 1.8 km || 
|-id=079 bgcolor=#fefefe
| 258079 ||  || — || August 10, 2001 || Haleakala || NEAT || H || align=right data-sort-value="0.93" | 930 m || 
|-id=080 bgcolor=#E9E9E9
| 258080 ||  || — || August 10, 2001 || Palomar || NEAT || — || align=right | 1.0 km || 
|-id=081 bgcolor=#E9E9E9
| 258081 ||  || — || August 11, 2001 || Palomar || NEAT || JUN || align=right | 1.2 km || 
|-id=082 bgcolor=#E9E9E9
| 258082 ||  || — || August 11, 2001 || Palomar || NEAT || — || align=right | 1.4 km || 
|-id=083 bgcolor=#E9E9E9
| 258083 ||  || — || August 13, 2001 || Palomar || NEAT || — || align=right | 2.9 km || 
|-id=084 bgcolor=#E9E9E9
| 258084 ||  || — || August 12, 2001 || Haleakala || NEAT || — || align=right | 1.3 km || 
|-id=085 bgcolor=#E9E9E9
| 258085 ||  || — || August 16, 2001 || Socorro || LINEAR || — || align=right | 1.9 km || 
|-id=086 bgcolor=#E9E9E9
| 258086 ||  || — || August 16, 2001 || Socorro || LINEAR || — || align=right | 1.3 km || 
|-id=087 bgcolor=#E9E9E9
| 258087 ||  || — || August 16, 2001 || Socorro || LINEAR || — || align=right | 2.8 km || 
|-id=088 bgcolor=#E9E9E9
| 258088 ||  || — || August 17, 2001 || Socorro || LINEAR || — || align=right | 1.9 km || 
|-id=089 bgcolor=#E9E9E9
| 258089 ||  || — || August 17, 2001 || Socorro || LINEAR || — || align=right | 2.6 km || 
|-id=090 bgcolor=#E9E9E9
| 258090 ||  || — || August 17, 2001 || Palomar || NEAT || EUN || align=right | 2.1 km || 
|-id=091 bgcolor=#E9E9E9
| 258091 ||  || — || August 17, 2001 || Socorro || LINEAR || — || align=right | 1.4 km || 
|-id=092 bgcolor=#E9E9E9
| 258092 ||  || — || August 17, 2001 || Socorro || LINEAR || — || align=right | 2.3 km || 
|-id=093 bgcolor=#E9E9E9
| 258093 ||  || — || August 21, 2001 || Socorro || LINEAR || RAF || align=right data-sort-value="0.96" | 960 m || 
|-id=094 bgcolor=#E9E9E9
| 258094 ||  || — || August 22, 2001 || Socorro || LINEAR || — || align=right | 1.5 km || 
|-id=095 bgcolor=#E9E9E9
| 258095 ||  || — || August 22, 2001 || Socorro || LINEAR || — || align=right | 2.3 km || 
|-id=096 bgcolor=#E9E9E9
| 258096 ||  || — || August 26, 2001 || Kitt Peak || Spacewatch || MRX || align=right | 1.5 km || 
|-id=097 bgcolor=#E9E9E9
| 258097 ||  || — || August 24, 2001 || Haleakala || NEAT || JUN || align=right | 1.5 km || 
|-id=098 bgcolor=#E9E9E9
| 258098 ||  || — || August 23, 2001 || Anderson Mesa || LONEOS || — || align=right | 1.1 km || 
|-id=099 bgcolor=#E9E9E9
| 258099 ||  || — || August 23, 2001 || Anderson Mesa || LONEOS || — || align=right | 1.7 km || 
|-id=100 bgcolor=#E9E9E9
| 258100 ||  || — || August 20, 2001 || Palomar || NEAT || — || align=right | 1.7 km || 
|}

258101–258200 

|-bgcolor=#E9E9E9
| 258101 ||  || — || August 22, 2001 || Haleakala || NEAT || — || align=right | 1.5 km || 
|-id=102 bgcolor=#E9E9E9
| 258102 ||  || — || August 24, 2001 || Socorro || LINEAR || — || align=right | 3.3 km || 
|-id=103 bgcolor=#E9E9E9
| 258103 ||  || — || August 22, 2001 || Palomar || NEAT || — || align=right | 1.5 km || 
|-id=104 bgcolor=#E9E9E9
| 258104 ||  || — || August 21, 2001 || Kitt Peak || Spacewatch || — || align=right | 1.7 km || 
|-id=105 bgcolor=#E9E9E9
| 258105 ||  || — || August 21, 2001 || Palomar || NEAT || — || align=right | 2.4 km || 
|-id=106 bgcolor=#E9E9E9
| 258106 ||  || — || August 22, 2001 || Socorro || LINEAR || — || align=right | 2.9 km || 
|-id=107 bgcolor=#E9E9E9
| 258107 ||  || — || August 22, 2001 || Palomar || NEAT || — || align=right | 2.2 km || 
|-id=108 bgcolor=#E9E9E9
| 258108 ||  || — || August 22, 2001 || Socorro || LINEAR || — || align=right | 2.3 km || 
|-id=109 bgcolor=#E9E9E9
| 258109 ||  || — || August 23, 2001 || Anderson Mesa || LONEOS || — || align=right | 3.6 km || 
|-id=110 bgcolor=#E9E9E9
| 258110 ||  || — || August 23, 2001 || Anderson Mesa || LONEOS || — || align=right | 1.9 km || 
|-id=111 bgcolor=#E9E9E9
| 258111 ||  || — || August 24, 2001 || Anderson Mesa || LONEOS || RAF || align=right | 1.5 km || 
|-id=112 bgcolor=#E9E9E9
| 258112 ||  || — || August 24, 2001 || Anderson Mesa || LONEOS || — || align=right | 2.9 km || 
|-id=113 bgcolor=#E9E9E9
| 258113 ||  || — || August 24, 2001 || Anderson Mesa || LONEOS || — || align=right | 1.4 km || 
|-id=114 bgcolor=#E9E9E9
| 258114 ||  || — || August 24, 2001 || Socorro || LINEAR || — || align=right | 2.6 km || 
|-id=115 bgcolor=#E9E9E9
| 258115 ||  || — || August 25, 2001 || Socorro || LINEAR || ADE || align=right | 2.5 km || 
|-id=116 bgcolor=#E9E9E9
| 258116 ||  || — || August 25, 2001 || Anderson Mesa || LONEOS || MAR || align=right | 1.6 km || 
|-id=117 bgcolor=#E9E9E9
| 258117 ||  || — || August 25, 2001 || Socorro || LINEAR || — || align=right | 1.7 km || 
|-id=118 bgcolor=#E9E9E9
| 258118 ||  || — || August 19, 2001 || Socorro || LINEAR || — || align=right | 1.4 km || 
|-id=119 bgcolor=#E9E9E9
| 258119 ||  || — || August 19, 2001 || Socorro || LINEAR || JUN || align=right | 1.3 km || 
|-id=120 bgcolor=#E9E9E9
| 258120 ||  || — || August 19, 2001 || Socorro || LINEAR || — || align=right | 1.6 km || 
|-id=121 bgcolor=#E9E9E9
| 258121 ||  || — || August 17, 2001 || Socorro || LINEAR || — || align=right | 3.0 km || 
|-id=122 bgcolor=#E9E9E9
| 258122 ||  || — || August 16, 2001 || Palomar || NEAT || — || align=right | 2.3 km || 
|-id=123 bgcolor=#FA8072
| 258123 ||  || — || August 31, 2001 || Palomar || NEAT || — || align=right | 2.8 km || 
|-id=124 bgcolor=#E9E9E9
| 258124 ||  || — || August 19, 2001 || Socorro || LINEAR || — || align=right | 1.8 km || 
|-id=125 bgcolor=#E9E9E9
| 258125 ||  || — || August 23, 2001 || Palomar || NEAT || JUN || align=right | 1.6 km || 
|-id=126 bgcolor=#E9E9E9
| 258126 ||  || — || September 8, 2001 || Socorro || LINEAR || — || align=right | 2.1 km || 
|-id=127 bgcolor=#E9E9E9
| 258127 ||  || — || September 7, 2001 || Socorro || LINEAR || — || align=right | 1.4 km || 
|-id=128 bgcolor=#E9E9E9
| 258128 ||  || — || September 7, 2001 || Socorro || LINEAR || BRU || align=right | 3.9 km || 
|-id=129 bgcolor=#E9E9E9
| 258129 ||  || — || September 7, 2001 || Socorro || LINEAR || EUN || align=right | 1.9 km || 
|-id=130 bgcolor=#E9E9E9
| 258130 ||  || — || September 7, 2001 || Socorro || LINEAR || — || align=right data-sort-value="0.98" | 980 m || 
|-id=131 bgcolor=#E9E9E9
| 258131 ||  || — || September 7, 2001 || Socorro || LINEAR || BRG || align=right | 1.9 km || 
|-id=132 bgcolor=#E9E9E9
| 258132 ||  || — || September 11, 2001 || Socorro || LINEAR || — || align=right | 2.4 km || 
|-id=133 bgcolor=#E9E9E9
| 258133 ||  || — || September 11, 2001 || Socorro || LINEAR || — || align=right | 2.5 km || 
|-id=134 bgcolor=#E9E9E9
| 258134 ||  || — || September 12, 2001 || Socorro || LINEAR || — || align=right | 1.4 km || 
|-id=135 bgcolor=#E9E9E9
| 258135 ||  || — || September 10, 2001 || Socorro || LINEAR || — || align=right | 3.5 km || 
|-id=136 bgcolor=#E9E9E9
| 258136 ||  || — || September 10, 2001 || Socorro || LINEAR || — || align=right | 2.0 km || 
|-id=137 bgcolor=#E9E9E9
| 258137 ||  || — || September 10, 2001 || Socorro || LINEAR || — || align=right | 1.7 km || 
|-id=138 bgcolor=#E9E9E9
| 258138 ||  || — || September 11, 2001 || Anderson Mesa || LONEOS || — || align=right | 1.4 km || 
|-id=139 bgcolor=#E9E9E9
| 258139 ||  || — || September 12, 2001 || Socorro || LINEAR || — || align=right | 1.0 km || 
|-id=140 bgcolor=#E9E9E9
| 258140 ||  || — || September 12, 2001 || Socorro || LINEAR || AST || align=right | 1.7 km || 
|-id=141 bgcolor=#d6d6d6
| 258141 ||  || — || September 12, 2001 || Socorro || LINEAR || 3:2 || align=right | 6.1 km || 
|-id=142 bgcolor=#E9E9E9
| 258142 ||  || — || September 12, 2001 || Socorro || LINEAR || — || align=right | 2.7 km || 
|-id=143 bgcolor=#E9E9E9
| 258143 ||  || — || September 12, 2001 || Socorro || LINEAR || — || align=right | 1.7 km || 
|-id=144 bgcolor=#d6d6d6
| 258144 ||  || — || September 12, 2001 || Socorro || LINEAR || 3:2 || align=right | 6.6 km || 
|-id=145 bgcolor=#E9E9E9
| 258145 ||  || — || September 12, 2001 || Socorro || LINEAR || AEO || align=right | 1.4 km || 
|-id=146 bgcolor=#E9E9E9
| 258146 ||  || — || September 12, 2001 || Socorro || LINEAR || — || align=right | 2.0 km || 
|-id=147 bgcolor=#E9E9E9
| 258147 ||  || — || September 8, 2001 || Socorro || LINEAR || JUN || align=right | 1.2 km || 
|-id=148 bgcolor=#d6d6d6
| 258148 ||  || — || September 11, 2001 || Anderson Mesa || LONEOS || SHU3:2 || align=right | 8.0 km || 
|-id=149 bgcolor=#E9E9E9
| 258149 ||  || — || September 18, 2001 || Goodricke-Pigott || R. A. Tucker || — || align=right | 3.0 km || 
|-id=150 bgcolor=#E9E9E9
| 258150 ||  || — || September 18, 2001 || Kitt Peak || Spacewatch || — || align=right | 1.9 km || 
|-id=151 bgcolor=#E9E9E9
| 258151 ||  || — || September 16, 2001 || Socorro || LINEAR || — || align=right | 1.7 km || 
|-id=152 bgcolor=#E9E9E9
| 258152 ||  || — || September 16, 2001 || Socorro || LINEAR || — || align=right | 1.6 km || 
|-id=153 bgcolor=#E9E9E9
| 258153 ||  || — || September 16, 2001 || Socorro || LINEAR || — || align=right | 1.2 km || 
|-id=154 bgcolor=#d6d6d6
| 258154 ||  || — || September 16, 2001 || Socorro || LINEAR || EUP || align=right | 5.6 km || 
|-id=155 bgcolor=#E9E9E9
| 258155 ||  || — || September 17, 2001 || Socorro || LINEAR || — || align=right | 2.3 km || 
|-id=156 bgcolor=#E9E9E9
| 258156 ||  || — || September 17, 2001 || Socorro || LINEAR || EUN || align=right | 2.0 km || 
|-id=157 bgcolor=#E9E9E9
| 258157 ||  || — || September 17, 2001 || Socorro || LINEAR || EUN || align=right | 1.5 km || 
|-id=158 bgcolor=#E9E9E9
| 258158 ||  || — || September 17, 2001 || Socorro || LINEAR || — || align=right | 2.5 km || 
|-id=159 bgcolor=#E9E9E9
| 258159 ||  || — || September 17, 2001 || Socorro || LINEAR || — || align=right | 1.6 km || 
|-id=160 bgcolor=#E9E9E9
| 258160 ||  || — || September 19, 2001 || Anderson Mesa || LONEOS || EUN || align=right | 1.9 km || 
|-id=161 bgcolor=#E9E9E9
| 258161 ||  || — || September 20, 2001 || Socorro || LINEAR || — || align=right | 1.8 km || 
|-id=162 bgcolor=#E9E9E9
| 258162 ||  || — || September 20, 2001 || Socorro || LINEAR || — || align=right | 1.2 km || 
|-id=163 bgcolor=#E9E9E9
| 258163 ||  || — || September 20, 2001 || Socorro || LINEAR || — || align=right | 3.1 km || 
|-id=164 bgcolor=#E9E9E9
| 258164 ||  || — || September 20, 2001 || Socorro || LINEAR || AGN || align=right | 1.4 km || 
|-id=165 bgcolor=#E9E9E9
| 258165 ||  || — || September 20, 2001 || Socorro || LINEAR || — || align=right | 2.1 km || 
|-id=166 bgcolor=#E9E9E9
| 258166 ||  || — || September 20, 2001 || Socorro || LINEAR || — || align=right | 1.1 km || 
|-id=167 bgcolor=#E9E9E9
| 258167 ||  || — || September 22, 2001 || Eskridge || G. Hug || — || align=right | 2.4 km || 
|-id=168 bgcolor=#E9E9E9
| 258168 ||  || — || September 16, 2001 || Socorro || LINEAR || — || align=right | 3.1 km || 
|-id=169 bgcolor=#E9E9E9
| 258169 ||  || — || September 16, 2001 || Socorro || LINEAR || RAF || align=right | 1.2 km || 
|-id=170 bgcolor=#E9E9E9
| 258170 ||  || — || September 16, 2001 || Socorro || LINEAR || — || align=right | 2.0 km || 
|-id=171 bgcolor=#E9E9E9
| 258171 ||  || — || September 16, 2001 || Socorro || LINEAR || — || align=right | 2.0 km || 
|-id=172 bgcolor=#E9E9E9
| 258172 ||  || — || September 16, 2001 || Socorro || LINEAR || — || align=right | 1.6 km || 
|-id=173 bgcolor=#E9E9E9
| 258173 ||  || — || September 16, 2001 || Socorro || LINEAR || — || align=right | 2.1 km || 
|-id=174 bgcolor=#E9E9E9
| 258174 ||  || — || September 16, 2001 || Socorro || LINEAR || — || align=right | 1.2 km || 
|-id=175 bgcolor=#E9E9E9
| 258175 ||  || — || September 16, 2001 || Socorro || LINEAR || — || align=right | 2.5 km || 
|-id=176 bgcolor=#E9E9E9
| 258176 ||  || — || September 17, 2001 || Socorro || LINEAR || — || align=right | 1.8 km || 
|-id=177 bgcolor=#E9E9E9
| 258177 ||  || — || September 17, 2001 || Socorro || LINEAR || — || align=right | 2.0 km || 
|-id=178 bgcolor=#E9E9E9
| 258178 ||  || — || September 17, 2001 || Socorro || LINEAR || — || align=right | 1.5 km || 
|-id=179 bgcolor=#E9E9E9
| 258179 ||  || — || September 19, 2001 || Socorro || LINEAR || — || align=right | 2.3 km || 
|-id=180 bgcolor=#E9E9E9
| 258180 ||  || — || September 16, 2001 || Socorro || LINEAR || — || align=right | 1.9 km || 
|-id=181 bgcolor=#E9E9E9
| 258181 ||  || — || September 17, 2001 || Socorro || LINEAR || — || align=right | 3.0 km || 
|-id=182 bgcolor=#E9E9E9
| 258182 ||  || — || September 19, 2001 || Socorro || LINEAR || — || align=right | 1.7 km || 
|-id=183 bgcolor=#E9E9E9
| 258183 ||  || — || September 19, 2001 || Socorro || LINEAR || — || align=right | 1.7 km || 
|-id=184 bgcolor=#E9E9E9
| 258184 ||  || — || September 19, 2001 || Socorro || LINEAR || — || align=right | 1.7 km || 
|-id=185 bgcolor=#E9E9E9
| 258185 ||  || — || September 19, 2001 || Socorro || LINEAR || — || align=right | 2.1 km || 
|-id=186 bgcolor=#E9E9E9
| 258186 ||  || — || September 19, 2001 || Socorro || LINEAR || — || align=right | 2.6 km || 
|-id=187 bgcolor=#E9E9E9
| 258187 ||  || — || September 19, 2001 || Socorro || LINEAR || ADE || align=right | 2.3 km || 
|-id=188 bgcolor=#E9E9E9
| 258188 ||  || — || September 19, 2001 || Socorro || LINEAR || — || align=right | 1.1 km || 
|-id=189 bgcolor=#E9E9E9
| 258189 ||  || — || September 19, 2001 || Socorro || LINEAR || — || align=right | 2.2 km || 
|-id=190 bgcolor=#E9E9E9
| 258190 ||  || — || September 19, 2001 || Socorro || LINEAR || — || align=right | 1.6 km || 
|-id=191 bgcolor=#E9E9E9
| 258191 ||  || — || September 19, 2001 || Socorro || LINEAR || — || align=right | 1.8 km || 
|-id=192 bgcolor=#E9E9E9
| 258192 ||  || — || September 19, 2001 || Socorro || LINEAR || — || align=right | 1.5 km || 
|-id=193 bgcolor=#E9E9E9
| 258193 ||  || — || September 19, 2001 || Socorro || LINEAR || — || align=right | 2.1 km || 
|-id=194 bgcolor=#d6d6d6
| 258194 ||  || — || September 19, 2001 || Socorro || LINEAR || NAE || align=right | 5.4 km || 
|-id=195 bgcolor=#E9E9E9
| 258195 ||  || — || September 18, 2001 || Kitt Peak || Spacewatch || — || align=right | 1.7 km || 
|-id=196 bgcolor=#E9E9E9
| 258196 ||  || — || September 21, 2001 || Anderson Mesa || LONEOS || — || align=right | 2.9 km || 
|-id=197 bgcolor=#E9E9E9
| 258197 ||  || — || September 28, 2001 || Fountain Hills || C. W. Juels, P. R. Holvorcem || — || align=right | 3.4 km || 
|-id=198 bgcolor=#E9E9E9
| 258198 ||  || — || September 28, 2001 || Palomar || NEAT || — || align=right | 2.2 km || 
|-id=199 bgcolor=#E9E9E9
| 258199 ||  || — || September 20, 2001 || Socorro || LINEAR || — || align=right | 1.8 km || 
|-id=200 bgcolor=#E9E9E9
| 258200 ||  || — || September 20, 2001 || Socorro || LINEAR || MAR || align=right | 1.4 km || 
|}

258201–258300 

|-bgcolor=#E9E9E9
| 258201 ||  || — || September 20, 2001 || Socorro || LINEAR || — || align=right | 2.0 km || 
|-id=202 bgcolor=#E9E9E9
| 258202 ||  || — || September 23, 2001 || Socorro || LINEAR || — || align=right | 3.3 km || 
|-id=203 bgcolor=#E9E9E9
| 258203 ||  || — || September 25, 2001 || Socorro || LINEAR || — || align=right | 2.3 km || 
|-id=204 bgcolor=#E9E9E9
| 258204 ||  || — || September 20, 2001 || Socorro || LINEAR || AGN || align=right | 1.5 km || 
|-id=205 bgcolor=#E9E9E9
| 258205 ||  || — || September 18, 2001 || Kitt Peak || Spacewatch || — || align=right | 1.8 km || 
|-id=206 bgcolor=#E9E9E9
| 258206 ||  || — || September 18, 2001 || Kitt Peak || Spacewatch || — || align=right | 1.8 km || 
|-id=207 bgcolor=#E9E9E9
| 258207 ||  || — || September 19, 2001 || Palomar || NEAT || — || align=right | 1.7 km || 
|-id=208 bgcolor=#E9E9E9
| 258208 ||  || — || September 20, 2001 || Socorro || LINEAR || — || align=right | 1.4 km || 
|-id=209 bgcolor=#E9E9E9
| 258209 ||  || — || September 26, 2001 || Socorro || LINEAR || — || align=right | 1.6 km || 
|-id=210 bgcolor=#E9E9E9
| 258210 ||  || — || September 20, 2001 || Socorro || LINEAR || — || align=right | 2.9 km || 
|-id=211 bgcolor=#E9E9E9
| 258211 ||  || — || September 18, 2001 || Apache Point || SDSS || RAF || align=right | 1.4 km || 
|-id=212 bgcolor=#E9E9E9
| 258212 ||  || — || September 18, 2001 || Anderson Mesa || LONEOS || — || align=right | 1.9 km || 
|-id=213 bgcolor=#E9E9E9
| 258213 ||  || — || October 8, 2001 || Palomar || NEAT || — || align=right | 2.4 km || 
|-id=214 bgcolor=#E9E9E9
| 258214 ||  || — || October 10, 2001 || Palomar || NEAT || — || align=right | 1.3 km || 
|-id=215 bgcolor=#E9E9E9
| 258215 ||  || — || October 13, 2001 || Socorro || LINEAR || — || align=right | 1.8 km || 
|-id=216 bgcolor=#E9E9E9
| 258216 ||  || — || October 14, 2001 || Goodricke-Pigott || R. A. Tucker || JUN || align=right | 1.7 km || 
|-id=217 bgcolor=#E9E9E9
| 258217 ||  || — || October 9, 2001 || Socorro || LINEAR || — || align=right | 3.2 km || 
|-id=218 bgcolor=#E9E9E9
| 258218 ||  || — || October 14, 2001 || Socorro || LINEAR || — || align=right | 2.5 km || 
|-id=219 bgcolor=#E9E9E9
| 258219 ||  || — || October 14, 2001 || Socorro || LINEAR || — || align=right | 2.8 km || 
|-id=220 bgcolor=#d6d6d6
| 258220 ||  || — || October 14, 2001 || Socorro || LINEAR || TRP || align=right | 4.2 km || 
|-id=221 bgcolor=#E9E9E9
| 258221 ||  || — || October 13, 2001 || Socorro || LINEAR || — || align=right | 2.1 km || 
|-id=222 bgcolor=#E9E9E9
| 258222 ||  || — || October 13, 2001 || Socorro || LINEAR || MIS || align=right | 3.0 km || 
|-id=223 bgcolor=#E9E9E9
| 258223 ||  || — || October 13, 2001 || Socorro || LINEAR || — || align=right | 2.7 km || 
|-id=224 bgcolor=#E9E9E9
| 258224 ||  || — || October 13, 2001 || Socorro || LINEAR || HEN || align=right | 1.7 km || 
|-id=225 bgcolor=#E9E9E9
| 258225 ||  || — || October 13, 2001 || Socorro || LINEAR || BAR || align=right | 2.4 km || 
|-id=226 bgcolor=#E9E9E9
| 258226 ||  || — || October 13, 2001 || Socorro || LINEAR || DOR || align=right | 2.9 km || 
|-id=227 bgcolor=#E9E9E9
| 258227 ||  || — || October 13, 2001 || Socorro || LINEAR || EUN || align=right | 1.9 km || 
|-id=228 bgcolor=#E9E9E9
| 258228 ||  || — || October 14, 2001 || Socorro || LINEAR || JUN || align=right | 1.5 km || 
|-id=229 bgcolor=#E9E9E9
| 258229 ||  || — || October 14, 2001 || Socorro || LINEAR || — || align=right | 1.6 km || 
|-id=230 bgcolor=#d6d6d6
| 258230 ||  || — || October 14, 2001 || Socorro || LINEAR || EOS || align=right | 2.9 km || 
|-id=231 bgcolor=#E9E9E9
| 258231 ||  || — || October 15, 2001 || Socorro || LINEAR || XIZ || align=right | 1.4 km || 
|-id=232 bgcolor=#E9E9E9
| 258232 ||  || — || October 14, 2001 || Socorro || LINEAR || — || align=right | 2.4 km || 
|-id=233 bgcolor=#E9E9E9
| 258233 ||  || — || October 14, 2001 || Socorro || LINEAR || — || align=right | 3.5 km || 
|-id=234 bgcolor=#E9E9E9
| 258234 ||  || — || October 14, 2001 || Socorro || LINEAR || — || align=right | 1.5 km || 
|-id=235 bgcolor=#E9E9E9
| 258235 ||  || — || October 14, 2001 || Socorro || LINEAR || — || align=right | 3.2 km || 
|-id=236 bgcolor=#E9E9E9
| 258236 ||  || — || October 15, 2001 || Socorro || LINEAR || — || align=right | 2.7 km || 
|-id=237 bgcolor=#E9E9E9
| 258237 ||  || — || October 15, 2001 || Socorro || LINEAR || — || align=right | 2.2 km || 
|-id=238 bgcolor=#E9E9E9
| 258238 ||  || — || October 15, 2001 || Socorro || LINEAR || ADE || align=right | 2.6 km || 
|-id=239 bgcolor=#C2FFFF
| 258239 ||  || — || October 15, 2001 || Socorro || LINEAR || L5 || align=right | 15 km || 
|-id=240 bgcolor=#E9E9E9
| 258240 ||  || — || October 13, 2001 || Palomar || NEAT || — || align=right | 1.7 km || 
|-id=241 bgcolor=#E9E9E9
| 258241 ||  || — || October 14, 2001 || Palomar || NEAT || GEF || align=right | 1.8 km || 
|-id=242 bgcolor=#E9E9E9
| 258242 ||  || — || October 10, 2001 || Palomar || NEAT || — || align=right | 2.0 km || 
|-id=243 bgcolor=#E9E9E9
| 258243 ||  || — || October 10, 2001 || Palomar || NEAT || — || align=right | 1.4 km || 
|-id=244 bgcolor=#E9E9E9
| 258244 ||  || — || October 13, 2001 || Kitt Peak || Spacewatch || — || align=right | 2.2 km || 
|-id=245 bgcolor=#E9E9E9
| 258245 ||  || — || October 15, 2001 || Kitt Peak || Spacewatch || — || align=right | 2.3 km || 
|-id=246 bgcolor=#E9E9E9
| 258246 ||  || — || October 11, 2001 || Palomar || NEAT || critical || align=right data-sort-value="0.94" | 940 m || 
|-id=247 bgcolor=#E9E9E9
| 258247 ||  || — || October 14, 2001 || Socorro || LINEAR || JUN || align=right | 1.5 km || 
|-id=248 bgcolor=#d6d6d6
| 258248 ||  || — || October 15, 2001 || Socorro || LINEAR || BRA || align=right | 2.2 km || 
|-id=249 bgcolor=#d6d6d6
| 258249 ||  || — || October 13, 2001 || Palomar || NEAT || — || align=right | 5.1 km || 
|-id=250 bgcolor=#E9E9E9
| 258250 ||  || — || October 15, 2001 || Haleakala || NEAT || — || align=right | 2.0 km || 
|-id=251 bgcolor=#E9E9E9
| 258251 ||  || — || October 14, 2001 || Socorro || LINEAR || — || align=right | 2.1 km || 
|-id=252 bgcolor=#E9E9E9
| 258252 ||  || — || October 14, 2001 || Socorro || LINEAR || — || align=right | 2.3 km || 
|-id=253 bgcolor=#E9E9E9
| 258253 ||  || — || October 14, 2001 || Socorro || LINEAR || — || align=right | 2.2 km || 
|-id=254 bgcolor=#d6d6d6
| 258254 ||  || — || October 14, 2001 || Socorro || LINEAR || EOS || align=right | 2.8 km || 
|-id=255 bgcolor=#E9E9E9
| 258255 ||  || — || October 14, 2001 || Socorro || LINEAR || — || align=right | 2.8 km || 
|-id=256 bgcolor=#E9E9E9
| 258256 ||  || — || October 14, 2001 || Socorro || LINEAR || — || align=right | 2.6 km || 
|-id=257 bgcolor=#E9E9E9
| 258257 ||  || — || October 15, 2001 || Palomar || NEAT || KON || align=right | 3.1 km || 
|-id=258 bgcolor=#E9E9E9
| 258258 ||  || — || October 11, 2001 || Socorro || LINEAR || — || align=right | 2.6 km || 
|-id=259 bgcolor=#E9E9E9
| 258259 ||  || — || October 11, 2001 || Socorro || LINEAR || BRG || align=right | 2.4 km || 
|-id=260 bgcolor=#E9E9E9
| 258260 ||  || — || October 11, 2001 || Palomar || NEAT || — || align=right | 2.6 km || 
|-id=261 bgcolor=#E9E9E9
| 258261 ||  || — || October 13, 2001 || Anderson Mesa || LONEOS || — || align=right | 2.2 km || 
|-id=262 bgcolor=#E9E9E9
| 258262 ||  || — || October 13, 2001 || Palomar || NEAT || — || align=right | 3.1 km || 
|-id=263 bgcolor=#E9E9E9
| 258263 ||  || — || October 14, 2001 || Anderson Mesa || LONEOS || — || align=right | 1.9 km || 
|-id=264 bgcolor=#E9E9E9
| 258264 ||  || — || October 14, 2001 || Socorro || LINEAR || — || align=right | 2.3 km || 
|-id=265 bgcolor=#E9E9E9
| 258265 ||  || — || October 15, 2001 || Socorro || LINEAR || — || align=right | 2.5 km || 
|-id=266 bgcolor=#E9E9E9
| 258266 ||  || — || October 15, 2001 || Kitt Peak || Spacewatch || — || align=right | 1.6 km || 
|-id=267 bgcolor=#E9E9E9
| 258267 ||  || — || October 15, 2001 || Kitt Peak || Spacewatch || HEN || align=right | 1.3 km || 
|-id=268 bgcolor=#E9E9E9
| 258268 ||  || — || October 15, 2001 || Palomar || NEAT || — || align=right | 2.3 km || 
|-id=269 bgcolor=#E9E9E9
| 258269 ||  || — || October 15, 2001 || Palomar || NEAT || — || align=right | 2.4 km || 
|-id=270 bgcolor=#E9E9E9
| 258270 ||  || — || October 14, 2001 || Apache Point || SDSS || — || align=right | 1.6 km || 
|-id=271 bgcolor=#E9E9E9
| 258271 ||  || — || October 10, 2001 || Palomar || NEAT || — || align=right | 1.1 km || 
|-id=272 bgcolor=#E9E9E9
| 258272 ||  || — || October 13, 2001 || Anderson Mesa || LONEOS || — || align=right | 2.6 km || 
|-id=273 bgcolor=#E9E9E9
| 258273 ||  || — || October 8, 2001 || Palomar || NEAT || — || align=right | 3.2 km || 
|-id=274 bgcolor=#E9E9E9
| 258274 || 2001 US || — || October 16, 2001 || Socorro || LINEAR || BAR || align=right | 1.5 km || 
|-id=275 bgcolor=#E9E9E9
| 258275 ||  || — || October 17, 2001 || Socorro || LINEAR || GER || align=right | 2.0 km || 
|-id=276 bgcolor=#E9E9E9
| 258276 ||  || — || October 24, 2001 || Desert Eagle || W. K. Y. Yeung || — || align=right | 1.8 km || 
|-id=277 bgcolor=#E9E9E9
| 258277 ||  || — || October 16, 2001 || Palomar || NEAT || — || align=right | 1.4 km || 
|-id=278 bgcolor=#E9E9E9
| 258278 ||  || — || October 16, 2001 || Palomar || NEAT || HNS || align=right | 1.4 km || 
|-id=279 bgcolor=#E9E9E9
| 258279 ||  || — || October 18, 2001 || Socorro || LINEAR || — || align=right | 2.4 km || 
|-id=280 bgcolor=#E9E9E9
| 258280 ||  || — || October 18, 2001 || Socorro || LINEAR || — || align=right | 3.2 km || 
|-id=281 bgcolor=#E9E9E9
| 258281 ||  || — || October 16, 2001 || Socorro || LINEAR || — || align=right | 2.1 km || 
|-id=282 bgcolor=#E9E9E9
| 258282 ||  || — || October 16, 2001 || Socorro || LINEAR || — || align=right | 3.0 km || 
|-id=283 bgcolor=#E9E9E9
| 258283 ||  || — || October 16, 2001 || Socorro || LINEAR || — || align=right | 2.6 km || 
|-id=284 bgcolor=#E9E9E9
| 258284 ||  || — || October 17, 2001 || Socorro || LINEAR || — || align=right | 1.4 km || 
|-id=285 bgcolor=#E9E9E9
| 258285 ||  || — || October 17, 2001 || Socorro || LINEAR || MIS || align=right | 3.6 km || 
|-id=286 bgcolor=#E9E9E9
| 258286 ||  || — || October 17, 2001 || Socorro || LINEAR || WIT || align=right | 1.4 km || 
|-id=287 bgcolor=#E9E9E9
| 258287 ||  || — || October 18, 2001 || Socorro || LINEAR || — || align=right | 1.4 km || 
|-id=288 bgcolor=#E9E9E9
| 258288 ||  || — || October 18, 2001 || Socorro || LINEAR || EUN || align=right | 2.2 km || 
|-id=289 bgcolor=#E9E9E9
| 258289 ||  || — || October 17, 2001 || Kitt Peak || Spacewatch || — || align=right | 1.8 km || 
|-id=290 bgcolor=#E9E9E9
| 258290 ||  || — || October 16, 2001 || Socorro || LINEAR || — || align=right | 1.6 km || 
|-id=291 bgcolor=#E9E9E9
| 258291 ||  || — || October 20, 2001 || Socorro || LINEAR || MIS || align=right | 3.5 km || 
|-id=292 bgcolor=#E9E9E9
| 258292 ||  || — || October 20, 2001 || Socorro || LINEAR || — || align=right | 1.7 km || 
|-id=293 bgcolor=#E9E9E9
| 258293 ||  || — || October 21, 2001 || Kitt Peak || Spacewatch || — || align=right | 1.4 km || 
|-id=294 bgcolor=#E9E9E9
| 258294 ||  || — || October 18, 2001 || Palomar || NEAT || — || align=right | 2.3 km || 
|-id=295 bgcolor=#E9E9E9
| 258295 ||  || — || October 19, 2001 || Palomar || NEAT || WIT || align=right | 1.1 km || 
|-id=296 bgcolor=#E9E9E9
| 258296 ||  || — || October 19, 2001 || Palomar || NEAT || VIB || align=right | 2.1 km || 
|-id=297 bgcolor=#E9E9E9
| 258297 ||  || — || October 19, 2001 || Palomar || NEAT || — || align=right | 2.2 km || 
|-id=298 bgcolor=#E9E9E9
| 258298 ||  || — || October 17, 2001 || Socorro || LINEAR || — || align=right | 2.1 km || 
|-id=299 bgcolor=#E9E9E9
| 258299 ||  || — || October 17, 2001 || Socorro || LINEAR || — || align=right | 2.6 km || 
|-id=300 bgcolor=#E9E9E9
| 258300 ||  || — || October 17, 2001 || Socorro || LINEAR || — || align=right | 2.2 km || 
|}

258301–258400 

|-bgcolor=#E9E9E9
| 258301 ||  || — || October 20, 2001 || Socorro || LINEAR || — || align=right | 2.1 km || 
|-id=302 bgcolor=#E9E9E9
| 258302 ||  || — || October 22, 2001 || Socorro || LINEAR || — || align=right | 2.1 km || 
|-id=303 bgcolor=#E9E9E9
| 258303 ||  || — || October 22, 2001 || Socorro || LINEAR || — || align=right | 2.3 km || 
|-id=304 bgcolor=#E9E9E9
| 258304 ||  || — || October 23, 2001 || Socorro || LINEAR || — || align=right | 2.7 km || 
|-id=305 bgcolor=#E9E9E9
| 258305 ||  || — || October 23, 2001 || Socorro || LINEAR || AGN || align=right | 1.7 km || 
|-id=306 bgcolor=#E9E9E9
| 258306 ||  || — || October 23, 2001 || Socorro || LINEAR || — || align=right | 2.5 km || 
|-id=307 bgcolor=#E9E9E9
| 258307 ||  || — || October 23, 2001 || Palomar || NEAT || CLO || align=right | 2.2 km || 
|-id=308 bgcolor=#d6d6d6
| 258308 ||  || — || October 21, 2001 || Socorro || LINEAR || HIL3:2 || align=right | 11 km || 
|-id=309 bgcolor=#E9E9E9
| 258309 ||  || — || October 23, 2001 || Socorro || LINEAR || — || align=right | 1.9 km || 
|-id=310 bgcolor=#E9E9E9
| 258310 ||  || — || October 18, 2001 || Palomar || NEAT || — || align=right | 2.3 km || 
|-id=311 bgcolor=#E9E9E9
| 258311 ||  || — || October 17, 2001 || Palomar || NEAT || — || align=right | 2.6 km || 
|-id=312 bgcolor=#E9E9E9
| 258312 ||  || — || October 18, 2001 || Palomar || NEAT || WIT || align=right | 1.1 km || 
|-id=313 bgcolor=#E9E9E9
| 258313 ||  || — || October 18, 2001 || Socorro || LINEAR || MAR || align=right | 1.8 km || 
|-id=314 bgcolor=#E9E9E9
| 258314 ||  || — || October 18, 2001 || Socorro || LINEAR || — || align=right | 2.3 km || 
|-id=315 bgcolor=#E9E9E9
| 258315 ||  || — || October 18, 2001 || Anderson Mesa || LONEOS || — || align=right | 4.0 km || 
|-id=316 bgcolor=#E9E9E9
| 258316 ||  || — || October 19, 2001 || Anderson Mesa || LONEOS || EUN || align=right | 2.0 km || 
|-id=317 bgcolor=#E9E9E9
| 258317 ||  || — || October 19, 2001 || Palomar || NEAT || — || align=right | 1.3 km || 
|-id=318 bgcolor=#E9E9E9
| 258318 ||  || — || October 19, 2001 || Palomar || NEAT || — || align=right | 1.6 km || 
|-id=319 bgcolor=#E9E9E9
| 258319 ||  || — || October 19, 2001 || Palomar || NEAT || — || align=right | 1.9 km || 
|-id=320 bgcolor=#E9E9E9
| 258320 ||  || — || October 20, 2001 || Kitt Peak || Spacewatch || PAD || align=right | 1.7 km || 
|-id=321 bgcolor=#E9E9E9
| 258321 ||  || — || October 21, 2001 || Socorro || LINEAR || — || align=right | 2.9 km || 
|-id=322 bgcolor=#E9E9E9
| 258322 ||  || — || October 24, 2001 || Palomar || NEAT || — || align=right | 2.1 km || 
|-id=323 bgcolor=#E9E9E9
| 258323 Róbertbarsa ||  ||  || October 16, 2001 || Palomar || NEAT || — || align=right | 1.4 km || 
|-id=324 bgcolor=#E9E9E9
| 258324 ||  || — || October 25, 2001 || Apache Point || SDSS || — || align=right | 2.1 km || 
|-id=325 bgcolor=#FFC2E0
| 258325 ||  || — || November 7, 2001 || Socorro || LINEAR || AMO || align=right data-sort-value="0.60" | 600 m || 
|-id=326 bgcolor=#E9E9E9
| 258326 ||  || — || November 9, 2001 || Socorro || LINEAR || ADE || align=right | 3.2 km || 
|-id=327 bgcolor=#E9E9E9
| 258327 ||  || — || November 9, 2001 || Socorro || LINEAR || — || align=right | 1.6 km || 
|-id=328 bgcolor=#E9E9E9
| 258328 ||  || — || November 10, 2001 || Socorro || LINEAR || — || align=right | 1.8 km || 
|-id=329 bgcolor=#E9E9E9
| 258329 ||  || — || November 10, 2001 || Bergisch Gladbach || W. Bickel || ADE || align=right | 2.7 km || 
|-id=330 bgcolor=#d6d6d6
| 258330 ||  || — || November 9, 2001 || Socorro || LINEAR || — || align=right | 4.0 km || 
|-id=331 bgcolor=#E9E9E9
| 258331 ||  || — || November 9, 2001 || Socorro || LINEAR || — || align=right | 1.7 km || 
|-id=332 bgcolor=#E9E9E9
| 258332 ||  || — || November 11, 2001 || Socorro || LINEAR || RAF || align=right | 1.2 km || 
|-id=333 bgcolor=#E9E9E9
| 258333 ||  || — || November 11, 2001 || Socorro || LINEAR || — || align=right | 2.2 km || 
|-id=334 bgcolor=#E9E9E9
| 258334 ||  || — || November 11, 2001 || Socorro || LINEAR || — || align=right | 3.4 km || 
|-id=335 bgcolor=#E9E9E9
| 258335 ||  || — || November 11, 2001 || Socorro || LINEAR || — || align=right | 3.0 km || 
|-id=336 bgcolor=#E9E9E9
| 258336 ||  || — || November 11, 2001 || Socorro || LINEAR || — || align=right | 2.3 km || 
|-id=337 bgcolor=#E9E9E9
| 258337 ||  || — || November 12, 2001 || Kitt Peak || Spacewatch || — || align=right | 1.5 km || 
|-id=338 bgcolor=#E9E9E9
| 258338 ||  || — || November 12, 2001 || Kitt Peak || Spacewatch || — || align=right | 1.4 km || 
|-id=339 bgcolor=#E9E9E9
| 258339 ||  || — || November 11, 2001 || Kitt Peak || Spacewatch || — || align=right | 2.8 km || 
|-id=340 bgcolor=#E9E9E9
| 258340 ||  || — || November 12, 2001 || Socorro || LINEAR || — || align=right | 3.1 km || 
|-id=341 bgcolor=#E9E9E9
| 258341 ||  || — || November 15, 2001 || Socorro || LINEAR || — || align=right | 2.1 km || 
|-id=342 bgcolor=#E9E9E9
| 258342 ||  || — || November 15, 2001 || Socorro || LINEAR || EUN || align=right | 1.6 km || 
|-id=343 bgcolor=#E9E9E9
| 258343 ||  || — || November 15, 2001 || Socorro || LINEAR || — || align=right | 2.2 km || 
|-id=344 bgcolor=#E9E9E9
| 258344 ||  || — || November 12, 2001 || Socorro || LINEAR || — || align=right | 2.2 km || 
|-id=345 bgcolor=#E9E9E9
| 258345 ||  || — || November 12, 2001 || Socorro || LINEAR || — || align=right | 2.4 km || 
|-id=346 bgcolor=#E9E9E9
| 258346 ||  || — || November 12, 2001 || Socorro || LINEAR || — || align=right | 1.9 km || 
|-id=347 bgcolor=#fefefe
| 258347 ||  || — || November 12, 2001 || Socorro || LINEAR || — || align=right data-sort-value="0.97" | 970 m || 
|-id=348 bgcolor=#d6d6d6
| 258348 ||  || — || November 12, 2001 || Socorro || LINEAR || KOR || align=right | 1.8 km || 
|-id=349 bgcolor=#E9E9E9
| 258349 ||  || — || November 12, 2001 || Socorro || LINEAR || MRX || align=right | 1.5 km || 
|-id=350 bgcolor=#E9E9E9
| 258350 ||  || — || November 12, 2001 || Socorro || LINEAR || — || align=right | 2.0 km || 
|-id=351 bgcolor=#E9E9E9
| 258351 ||  || — || November 12, 2001 || Socorro || LINEAR || — || align=right | 4.4 km || 
|-id=352 bgcolor=#E9E9E9
| 258352 || 2001 WL || — || November 16, 2001 || Kitt Peak || Spacewatch || — || align=right | 2.2 km || 
|-id=353 bgcolor=#E9E9E9
| 258353 ||  || — || November 16, 2001 || Kitt Peak || Spacewatch || — || align=right | 1.9 km || 
|-id=354 bgcolor=#E9E9E9
| 258354 ||  || — || November 17, 2001 || Socorro || LINEAR || — || align=right | 3.2 km || 
|-id=355 bgcolor=#E9E9E9
| 258355 ||  || — || November 17, 2001 || Socorro || LINEAR || — || align=right | 1.7 km || 
|-id=356 bgcolor=#E9E9E9
| 258356 ||  || — || November 18, 2001 || Socorro || LINEAR || — || align=right | 3.3 km || 
|-id=357 bgcolor=#E9E9E9
| 258357 ||  || — || November 18, 2001 || Socorro || LINEAR || — || align=right | 2.1 km || 
|-id=358 bgcolor=#E9E9E9
| 258358 ||  || — || November 19, 2001 || Anderson Mesa || LONEOS || — || align=right | 2.5 km || 
|-id=359 bgcolor=#E9E9E9
| 258359 ||  || — || November 19, 2001 || Anderson Mesa || LONEOS || — || align=right | 3.7 km || 
|-id=360 bgcolor=#E9E9E9
| 258360 ||  || — || November 19, 2001 || Socorro || LINEAR || — || align=right | 3.7 km || 
|-id=361 bgcolor=#E9E9E9
| 258361 ||  || — || November 19, 2001 || Socorro || LINEAR || — || align=right | 1.8 km || 
|-id=362 bgcolor=#E9E9E9
| 258362 ||  || — || November 19, 2001 || Socorro || LINEAR || — || align=right | 1.5 km || 
|-id=363 bgcolor=#E9E9E9
| 258363 ||  || — || November 20, 2001 || Socorro || LINEAR || — || align=right | 1.8 km || 
|-id=364 bgcolor=#E9E9E9
| 258364 ||  || — || November 20, 2001 || Socorro || LINEAR || — || align=right | 2.1 km || 
|-id=365 bgcolor=#C2FFFF
| 258365 ||  || — || November 20, 2001 || Socorro || LINEAR || L5 || align=right | 9.8 km || 
|-id=366 bgcolor=#E9E9E9
| 258366 ||  || — || November 20, 2001 || Socorro || LINEAR || WIT || align=right | 1.3 km || 
|-id=367 bgcolor=#E9E9E9
| 258367 ||  || — || November 19, 2001 || Socorro || LINEAR || — || align=right | 1.7 km || 
|-id=368 bgcolor=#E9E9E9
| 258368 ||  || — || November 20, 2001 || Socorro || LINEAR || — || align=right | 2.3 km || 
|-id=369 bgcolor=#d6d6d6
| 258369 ||  || — || November 21, 2001 || Socorro || LINEAR || — || align=right | 4.1 km || 
|-id=370 bgcolor=#E9E9E9
| 258370 ||  || — || November 17, 2001 || Kitt Peak || Spacewatch || — || align=right | 2.4 km || 
|-id=371 bgcolor=#E9E9E9
| 258371 || 2001 XS || — || December 7, 2001 || Eskridge || G. Hug || — || align=right | 3.1 km || 
|-id=372 bgcolor=#E9E9E9
| 258372 ||  || — || December 8, 2001 || Uccle || H. Boffin || JUN || align=right | 1.2 km || 
|-id=373 bgcolor=#E9E9E9
| 258373 ||  || — || December 7, 2001 || Socorro || LINEAR || — || align=right | 3.4 km || 
|-id=374 bgcolor=#E9E9E9
| 258374 ||  || — || December 9, 2001 || Socorro || LINEAR || — || align=right | 3.2 km || 
|-id=375 bgcolor=#E9E9E9
| 258375 ||  || — || December 9, 2001 || Socorro || LINEAR || MRX || align=right | 1.4 km || 
|-id=376 bgcolor=#d6d6d6
| 258376 ||  || — || December 9, 2001 || Socorro || LINEAR || — || align=right | 4.8 km || 
|-id=377 bgcolor=#d6d6d6
| 258377 ||  || — || December 9, 2001 || Socorro || LINEAR || URS || align=right | 5.0 km || 
|-id=378 bgcolor=#E9E9E9
| 258378 ||  || — || December 9, 2001 || Socorro || LINEAR || — || align=right | 2.4 km || 
|-id=379 bgcolor=#E9E9E9
| 258379 ||  || — || December 9, 2001 || Socorro || LINEAR || — || align=right | 2.0 km || 
|-id=380 bgcolor=#E9E9E9
| 258380 ||  || — || December 9, 2001 || Socorro || LINEAR || — || align=right | 3.2 km || 
|-id=381 bgcolor=#d6d6d6
| 258381 ||  || — || December 9, 2001 || Socorro || LINEAR || TRE || align=right | 3.7 km || 
|-id=382 bgcolor=#E9E9E9
| 258382 ||  || — || December 9, 2001 || Socorro || LINEAR || — || align=right | 4.0 km || 
|-id=383 bgcolor=#E9E9E9
| 258383 ||  || — || December 11, 2001 || Socorro || LINEAR || — || align=right | 1.9 km || 
|-id=384 bgcolor=#E9E9E9
| 258384 ||  || — || December 10, 2001 || Socorro || LINEAR || — || align=right | 1.8 km || 
|-id=385 bgcolor=#E9E9E9
| 258385 ||  || — || December 10, 2001 || Socorro || LINEAR || CLO || align=right | 3.0 km || 
|-id=386 bgcolor=#E9E9E9
| 258386 ||  || — || December 10, 2001 || Socorro || LINEAR || — || align=right | 2.7 km || 
|-id=387 bgcolor=#E9E9E9
| 258387 ||  || — || December 10, 2001 || Socorro || LINEAR || — || align=right | 4.1 km || 
|-id=388 bgcolor=#E9E9E9
| 258388 ||  || — || December 11, 2001 || Socorro || LINEAR || — || align=right | 2.5 km || 
|-id=389 bgcolor=#E9E9E9
| 258389 ||  || — || December 11, 2001 || Socorro || LINEAR || MAR || align=right | 1.6 km || 
|-id=390 bgcolor=#E9E9E9
| 258390 ||  || — || December 11, 2001 || Socorro || LINEAR || — || align=right | 2.4 km || 
|-id=391 bgcolor=#E9E9E9
| 258391 ||  || — || December 11, 2001 || Socorro || LINEAR || — || align=right | 3.1 km || 
|-id=392 bgcolor=#E9E9E9
| 258392 ||  || — || December 11, 2001 || Socorro || LINEAR || XIZ || align=right | 1.8 km || 
|-id=393 bgcolor=#E9E9E9
| 258393 ||  || — || December 11, 2001 || Socorro || LINEAR || — || align=right | 3.5 km || 
|-id=394 bgcolor=#E9E9E9
| 258394 ||  || — || December 14, 2001 || Desert Eagle || W. K. Y. Yeung || VIB || align=right | 2.8 km || 
|-id=395 bgcolor=#E9E9E9
| 258395 ||  || — || December 10, 2001 || Socorro || LINEAR || ADE || align=right | 3.0 km || 
|-id=396 bgcolor=#E9E9E9
| 258396 ||  || — || December 10, 2001 || Socorro || LINEAR || INO || align=right | 2.0 km || 
|-id=397 bgcolor=#E9E9E9
| 258397 ||  || — || December 10, 2001 || Socorro || LINEAR || — || align=right | 4.3 km || 
|-id=398 bgcolor=#fefefe
| 258398 ||  || — || December 14, 2001 || Kitt Peak || Spacewatch || — || align=right data-sort-value="0.80" | 800 m || 
|-id=399 bgcolor=#E9E9E9
| 258399 ||  || — || December 11, 2001 || Socorro || LINEAR || — || align=right | 2.4 km || 
|-id=400 bgcolor=#E9E9E9
| 258400 ||  || — || December 13, 2001 || Socorro || LINEAR || — || align=right | 3.2 km || 
|}

258401–258500 

|-bgcolor=#E9E9E9
| 258401 ||  || — || December 14, 2001 || Socorro || LINEAR || — || align=right | 4.2 km || 
|-id=402 bgcolor=#E9E9E9
| 258402 ||  || — || December 14, 2001 || Socorro || LINEAR || — || align=right | 2.7 km || 
|-id=403 bgcolor=#E9E9E9
| 258403 ||  || — || December 14, 2001 || Socorro || LINEAR || AER || align=right | 1.9 km || 
|-id=404 bgcolor=#E9E9E9
| 258404 ||  || — || December 14, 2001 || Socorro || LINEAR || — || align=right | 6.1 km || 
|-id=405 bgcolor=#E9E9E9
| 258405 ||  || — || December 14, 2001 || Socorro || LINEAR || MRX || align=right | 1.2 km || 
|-id=406 bgcolor=#E9E9E9
| 258406 ||  || — || December 14, 2001 || Socorro || LINEAR || — || align=right | 3.2 km || 
|-id=407 bgcolor=#E9E9E9
| 258407 ||  || — || December 14, 2001 || Socorro || LINEAR || CLO || align=right | 2.7 km || 
|-id=408 bgcolor=#E9E9E9
| 258408 ||  || — || December 14, 2001 || Socorro || LINEAR || — || align=right | 2.0 km || 
|-id=409 bgcolor=#E9E9E9
| 258409 ||  || — || December 14, 2001 || Socorro || LINEAR || 526 || align=right | 2.7 km || 
|-id=410 bgcolor=#E9E9E9
| 258410 ||  || — || December 14, 2001 || Socorro || LINEAR || PAE || align=right | 3.1 km || 
|-id=411 bgcolor=#E9E9E9
| 258411 ||  || — || December 14, 2001 || Socorro || LINEAR || — || align=right | 2.6 km || 
|-id=412 bgcolor=#E9E9E9
| 258412 ||  || — || December 14, 2001 || Socorro || LINEAR || NEM || align=right | 3.0 km || 
|-id=413 bgcolor=#E9E9E9
| 258413 ||  || — || December 14, 2001 || Socorro || LINEAR || — || align=right | 2.6 km || 
|-id=414 bgcolor=#d6d6d6
| 258414 ||  || — || December 14, 2001 || Socorro || LINEAR || — || align=right | 4.5 km || 
|-id=415 bgcolor=#E9E9E9
| 258415 ||  || — || December 14, 2001 || Socorro || LINEAR || — || align=right | 2.7 km || 
|-id=416 bgcolor=#E9E9E9
| 258416 ||  || — || December 14, 2001 || Socorro || LINEAR || — || align=right | 2.7 km || 
|-id=417 bgcolor=#d6d6d6
| 258417 ||  || — || December 14, 2001 || Socorro || LINEAR || — || align=right | 4.4 km || 
|-id=418 bgcolor=#d6d6d6
| 258418 ||  || — || December 14, 2001 || Socorro || LINEAR || — || align=right | 3.9 km || 
|-id=419 bgcolor=#E9E9E9
| 258419 ||  || — || December 14, 2001 || Socorro || LINEAR || DOR || align=right | 3.3 km || 
|-id=420 bgcolor=#E9E9E9
| 258420 ||  || — || December 14, 2001 || Socorro || LINEAR || — || align=right | 3.3 km || 
|-id=421 bgcolor=#E9E9E9
| 258421 ||  || — || December 14, 2001 || Socorro || LINEAR || — || align=right | 2.0 km || 
|-id=422 bgcolor=#E9E9E9
| 258422 ||  || — || December 14, 2001 || Socorro || LINEAR || — || align=right | 3.4 km || 
|-id=423 bgcolor=#E9E9E9
| 258423 ||  || — || December 14, 2001 || Socorro || LINEAR || — || align=right | 2.6 km || 
|-id=424 bgcolor=#d6d6d6
| 258424 ||  || — || December 14, 2001 || Socorro || LINEAR || — || align=right | 3.2 km || 
|-id=425 bgcolor=#E9E9E9
| 258425 ||  || — || December 14, 2001 || Socorro || LINEAR || — || align=right | 3.7 km || 
|-id=426 bgcolor=#d6d6d6
| 258426 ||  || — || December 14, 2001 || Socorro || LINEAR || — || align=right | 5.9 km || 
|-id=427 bgcolor=#fefefe
| 258427 ||  || — || December 14, 2001 || Socorro || LINEAR || — || align=right | 1.2 km || 
|-id=428 bgcolor=#E9E9E9
| 258428 ||  || — || December 14, 2001 || Socorro || LINEAR || — || align=right | 2.2 km || 
|-id=429 bgcolor=#E9E9E9
| 258429 ||  || — || December 11, 2001 || Socorro || LINEAR || — || align=right | 4.0 km || 
|-id=430 bgcolor=#d6d6d6
| 258430 ||  || — || December 11, 2001 || Socorro || LINEAR || EOS || align=right | 2.7 km || 
|-id=431 bgcolor=#E9E9E9
| 258431 ||  || — || December 11, 2001 || Socorro || LINEAR || — || align=right | 2.1 km || 
|-id=432 bgcolor=#E9E9E9
| 258432 ||  || — || December 11, 2001 || Socorro || LINEAR || — || align=right | 3.6 km || 
|-id=433 bgcolor=#E9E9E9
| 258433 ||  || — || December 11, 2001 || Socorro || LINEAR || GAL || align=right | 2.8 km || 
|-id=434 bgcolor=#E9E9E9
| 258434 ||  || — || December 15, 2001 || Socorro || LINEAR || — || align=right | 3.2 km || 
|-id=435 bgcolor=#E9E9E9
| 258435 ||  || — || December 15, 2001 || Socorro || LINEAR || — || align=right | 2.3 km || 
|-id=436 bgcolor=#E9E9E9
| 258436 ||  || — || December 15, 2001 || Socorro || LINEAR || GEF || align=right | 1.7 km || 
|-id=437 bgcolor=#E9E9E9
| 258437 ||  || — || December 15, 2001 || Socorro || LINEAR || MRX || align=right | 1.3 km || 
|-id=438 bgcolor=#E9E9E9
| 258438 ||  || — || December 15, 2001 || Socorro || LINEAR || — || align=right | 2.5 km || 
|-id=439 bgcolor=#E9E9E9
| 258439 ||  || — || December 15, 2001 || Socorro || LINEAR || — || align=right | 1.7 km || 
|-id=440 bgcolor=#E9E9E9
| 258440 ||  || — || December 15, 2001 || Socorro || LINEAR || — || align=right | 2.1 km || 
|-id=441 bgcolor=#E9E9E9
| 258441 ||  || — || December 15, 2001 || Socorro || LINEAR || — || align=right | 3.1 km || 
|-id=442 bgcolor=#d6d6d6
| 258442 ||  || — || December 14, 2001 || Socorro || LINEAR || CHA || align=right | 2.7 km || 
|-id=443 bgcolor=#fefefe
| 258443 ||  || — || December 14, 2001 || Socorro || LINEAR || FLO || align=right data-sort-value="0.75" | 750 m || 
|-id=444 bgcolor=#E9E9E9
| 258444 ||  || — || December 14, 2001 || Socorro || LINEAR || — || align=right | 3.5 km || 
|-id=445 bgcolor=#E9E9E9
| 258445 ||  || — || December 14, 2001 || Kitt Peak || Spacewatch || AGN || align=right | 1.8 km || 
|-id=446 bgcolor=#E9E9E9
| 258446 ||  || — || December 14, 2001 || Socorro || LINEAR || — || align=right | 4.1 km || 
|-id=447 bgcolor=#E9E9E9
| 258447 ||  || — || December 14, 2001 || Socorro || LINEAR || — || align=right | 2.0 km || 
|-id=448 bgcolor=#E9E9E9
| 258448 ||  || — || December 14, 2001 || Socorro || LINEAR || — || align=right | 3.7 km || 
|-id=449 bgcolor=#E9E9E9
| 258449 ||  || — || December 7, 2001 || Socorro || LINEAR || — || align=right | 1.8 km || 
|-id=450 bgcolor=#E9E9E9
| 258450 ||  || — || December 14, 2001 || Socorro || LINEAR || GEF || align=right | 1.5 km || 
|-id=451 bgcolor=#E9E9E9
| 258451 ||  || — || December 17, 2001 || Socorro || LINEAR || — || align=right | 2.9 km || 
|-id=452 bgcolor=#E9E9E9
| 258452 ||  || — || December 17, 2001 || Socorro || LINEAR || — || align=right | 2.6 km || 
|-id=453 bgcolor=#E9E9E9
| 258453 ||  || — || December 18, 2001 || Socorro || LINEAR || — || align=right | 2.9 km || 
|-id=454 bgcolor=#E9E9E9
| 258454 ||  || — || December 18, 2001 || Socorro || LINEAR || — || align=right | 3.4 km || 
|-id=455 bgcolor=#E9E9E9
| 258455 ||  || — || December 18, 2001 || Socorro || LINEAR || — || align=right | 3.8 km || 
|-id=456 bgcolor=#E9E9E9
| 258456 ||  || — || December 18, 2001 || Socorro || LINEAR || GEF || align=right | 1.8 km || 
|-id=457 bgcolor=#E9E9E9
| 258457 ||  || — || December 18, 2001 || Socorro || LINEAR || CLO || align=right | 2.5 km || 
|-id=458 bgcolor=#E9E9E9
| 258458 ||  || — || December 17, 2001 || Socorro || LINEAR || AEO || align=right | 1.7 km || 
|-id=459 bgcolor=#d6d6d6
| 258459 ||  || — || December 17, 2001 || Socorro || LINEAR || — || align=right | 3.6 km || 
|-id=460 bgcolor=#E9E9E9
| 258460 ||  || — || December 17, 2001 || Socorro || LINEAR || DOR || align=right | 3.4 km || 
|-id=461 bgcolor=#E9E9E9
| 258461 ||  || — || December 20, 2001 || Socorro || LINEAR || — || align=right | 3.1 km || 
|-id=462 bgcolor=#d6d6d6
| 258462 ||  || — || December 17, 2001 || Socorro || LINEAR || — || align=right | 3.8 km || 
|-id=463 bgcolor=#E9E9E9
| 258463 ||  || — || December 17, 2001 || Socorro || LINEAR || GEF || align=right | 2.0 km || 
|-id=464 bgcolor=#E9E9E9
| 258464 ||  || — || December 17, 2001 || Socorro || LINEAR || GEF || align=right | 1.9 km || 
|-id=465 bgcolor=#E9E9E9
| 258465 ||  || — || December 17, 2001 || Socorro || LINEAR || — || align=right | 1.9 km || 
|-id=466 bgcolor=#E9E9E9
| 258466 ||  || — || December 17, 2001 || Socorro || LINEAR || — || align=right | 3.4 km || 
|-id=467 bgcolor=#E9E9E9
| 258467 ||  || — || December 18, 2001 || Socorro || LINEAR || EUN || align=right | 1.7 km || 
|-id=468 bgcolor=#d6d6d6
| 258468 ||  || — || December 20, 2001 || Kitt Peak || Spacewatch || EOS || align=right | 2.9 km || 
|-id=469 bgcolor=#E9E9E9
| 258469 ||  || — || December 19, 2001 || Socorro || LINEAR || HNA || align=right | 3.3 km || 
|-id=470 bgcolor=#E9E9E9
| 258470 ||  || — || December 17, 2001 || Socorro || LINEAR || — || align=right | 2.9 km || 
|-id=471 bgcolor=#E9E9E9
| 258471 ||  || — || December 19, 2001 || Socorro || LINEAR || EUN || align=right | 1.6 km || 
|-id=472 bgcolor=#d6d6d6
| 258472 ||  || — || December 19, 2001 || Palomar || NEAT || — || align=right | 4.5 km || 
|-id=473 bgcolor=#E9E9E9
| 258473 ||  || — || December 18, 2001 || Kitt Peak || Spacewatch || — || align=right | 2.9 km || 
|-id=474 bgcolor=#E9E9E9
| 258474 ||  || — || January 10, 2002 || Campo Imperatore || CINEOS || JUN || align=right | 1.3 km || 
|-id=475 bgcolor=#E9E9E9
| 258475 ||  || — || January 10, 2002 || Campo Imperatore || CINEOS || INO || align=right | 1.5 km || 
|-id=476 bgcolor=#E9E9E9
| 258476 ||  || — || January 11, 2002 || Desert Eagle || W. K. Y. Yeung || slow || align=right | 2.6 km || 
|-id=477 bgcolor=#E9E9E9
| 258477 ||  || — || January 5, 2002 || Haleakala || NEAT || — || align=right | 2.9 km || 
|-id=478 bgcolor=#E9E9E9
| 258478 ||  || — || January 15, 2002 || Socorro || LINEAR || — || align=right | 3.2 km || 
|-id=479 bgcolor=#E9E9E9
| 258479 ||  || — || January 5, 2002 || Haleakala || NEAT || — || align=right | 4.5 km || 
|-id=480 bgcolor=#E9E9E9
| 258480 ||  || — || January 5, 2002 || Haleakala || NEAT || EUN || align=right | 2.4 km || 
|-id=481 bgcolor=#E9E9E9
| 258481 ||  || — || January 8, 2002 || Palomar || NEAT || CLO || align=right | 3.1 km || 
|-id=482 bgcolor=#E9E9E9
| 258482 ||  || — || January 8, 2002 || Kitt Peak || Spacewatch || — || align=right | 3.2 km || 
|-id=483 bgcolor=#E9E9E9
| 258483 ||  || — || January 8, 2002 || Socorro || LINEAR || MRX || align=right | 1.3 km || 
|-id=484 bgcolor=#E9E9E9
| 258484 ||  || — || January 9, 2002 || Socorro || LINEAR || — || align=right | 4.6 km || 
|-id=485 bgcolor=#d6d6d6
| 258485 ||  || — || January 9, 2002 || Socorro || LINEAR || — || align=right | 6.9 km || 
|-id=486 bgcolor=#E9E9E9
| 258486 ||  || — || January 9, 2002 || Socorro || LINEAR || AGN || align=right | 1.6 km || 
|-id=487 bgcolor=#d6d6d6
| 258487 ||  || — || January 9, 2002 || Socorro || LINEAR || — || align=right | 4.3 km || 
|-id=488 bgcolor=#E9E9E9
| 258488 ||  || — || January 9, 2002 || Socorro || LINEAR || — || align=right | 3.2 km || 
|-id=489 bgcolor=#E9E9E9
| 258489 ||  || — || January 9, 2002 || Socorro || LINEAR || — || align=right | 3.7 km || 
|-id=490 bgcolor=#fefefe
| 258490 ||  || — || January 9, 2002 || Socorro || LINEAR || — || align=right | 1.1 km || 
|-id=491 bgcolor=#E9E9E9
| 258491 ||  || — || January 9, 2002 || Socorro || LINEAR || — || align=right | 2.9 km || 
|-id=492 bgcolor=#d6d6d6
| 258492 ||  || — || January 9, 2002 || Socorro || LINEAR || EOS || align=right | 2.8 km || 
|-id=493 bgcolor=#d6d6d6
| 258493 ||  || — || January 9, 2002 || Socorro || LINEAR || EOS || align=right | 2.7 km || 
|-id=494 bgcolor=#d6d6d6
| 258494 ||  || — || January 9, 2002 || Socorro || LINEAR || — || align=right | 6.3 km || 
|-id=495 bgcolor=#d6d6d6
| 258495 ||  || — || January 11, 2002 || Socorro || LINEAR || — || align=right | 4.4 km || 
|-id=496 bgcolor=#fefefe
| 258496 ||  || — || January 11, 2002 || Socorro || LINEAR || — || align=right | 1.6 km || 
|-id=497 bgcolor=#E9E9E9
| 258497 ||  || — || January 12, 2002 || Socorro || LINEAR || — || align=right | 2.7 km || 
|-id=498 bgcolor=#E9E9E9
| 258498 ||  || — || January 12, 2002 || Socorro || LINEAR || — || align=right | 2.7 km || 
|-id=499 bgcolor=#d6d6d6
| 258499 ||  || — || January 12, 2002 || Socorro || LINEAR || — || align=right | 3.3 km || 
|-id=500 bgcolor=#E9E9E9
| 258500 ||  || — || January 8, 2002 || Socorro || LINEAR || NEM || align=right | 3.5 km || 
|}

258501–258600 

|-bgcolor=#E9E9E9
| 258501 ||  || — || January 8, 2002 || Socorro || LINEAR || — || align=right | 2.9 km || 
|-id=502 bgcolor=#fefefe
| 258502 ||  || — || January 9, 2002 || Socorro || LINEAR || — || align=right data-sort-value="0.87" | 870 m || 
|-id=503 bgcolor=#d6d6d6
| 258503 ||  || — || January 9, 2002 || Socorro || LINEAR || — || align=right | 3.1 km || 
|-id=504 bgcolor=#E9E9E9
| 258504 ||  || — || January 9, 2002 || Socorro || LINEAR || — || align=right | 3.6 km || 
|-id=505 bgcolor=#E9E9E9
| 258505 ||  || — || January 9, 2002 || Socorro || LINEAR || — || align=right | 3.1 km || 
|-id=506 bgcolor=#d6d6d6
| 258506 ||  || — || January 9, 2002 || Socorro || LINEAR || 629 || align=right | 2.0 km || 
|-id=507 bgcolor=#E9E9E9
| 258507 ||  || — || January 9, 2002 || Socorro || LINEAR || — || align=right | 3.7 km || 
|-id=508 bgcolor=#fefefe
| 258508 ||  || — || January 9, 2002 || Socorro || LINEAR || — || align=right | 1.3 km || 
|-id=509 bgcolor=#E9E9E9
| 258509 ||  || — || January 11, 2002 || Socorro || LINEAR || — || align=right | 3.9 km || 
|-id=510 bgcolor=#E9E9E9
| 258510 ||  || — || January 11, 2002 || Socorro || LINEAR || — || align=right | 3.5 km || 
|-id=511 bgcolor=#E9E9E9
| 258511 ||  || — || January 9, 2002 || Socorro || LINEAR || — || align=right | 3.2 km || 
|-id=512 bgcolor=#d6d6d6
| 258512 ||  || — || January 9, 2002 || Socorro || LINEAR || — || align=right | 4.5 km || 
|-id=513 bgcolor=#E9E9E9
| 258513 ||  || — || January 13, 2002 || Socorro || LINEAR || — || align=right | 2.9 km || 
|-id=514 bgcolor=#E9E9E9
| 258514 ||  || — || January 13, 2002 || Socorro || LINEAR || MAR || align=right | 1.7 km || 
|-id=515 bgcolor=#E9E9E9
| 258515 ||  || — || January 14, 2002 || Socorro || LINEAR || — || align=right | 4.4 km || 
|-id=516 bgcolor=#E9E9E9
| 258516 ||  || — || January 13, 2002 || Socorro || LINEAR || DOR || align=right | 4.2 km || 
|-id=517 bgcolor=#E9E9E9
| 258517 ||  || — || January 14, 2002 || Socorro || LINEAR || WIT || align=right | 1.4 km || 
|-id=518 bgcolor=#E9E9E9
| 258518 ||  || — || January 14, 2002 || Socorro || LINEAR || — || align=right | 3.3 km || 
|-id=519 bgcolor=#E9E9E9
| 258519 ||  || — || January 5, 2002 || Anderson Mesa || LONEOS || — || align=right | 3.4 km || 
|-id=520 bgcolor=#E9E9E9
| 258520 ||  || — || January 8, 2002 || Palomar || NEAT || — || align=right | 2.7 km || 
|-id=521 bgcolor=#E9E9E9
| 258521 ||  || — || January 12, 2002 || Socorro || LINEAR || — || align=right | 3.2 km || 
|-id=522 bgcolor=#d6d6d6
| 258522 ||  || — || January 14, 2002 || Palomar || NEAT || — || align=right | 4.5 km || 
|-id=523 bgcolor=#d6d6d6
| 258523 ||  || — || January 8, 2002 || Socorro || LINEAR || HYG || align=right | 3.6 km || 
|-id=524 bgcolor=#d6d6d6
| 258524 ||  || — || January 7, 2002 || Kitt Peak || Spacewatch || — || align=right | 3.9 km || 
|-id=525 bgcolor=#E9E9E9
| 258525 ||  || — || January 13, 2002 || Apache Point || SDSS || BRU || align=right | 3.8 km || 
|-id=526 bgcolor=#d6d6d6
| 258526 ||  || — || January 9, 2002 || Socorro || LINEAR || — || align=right | 5.0 km || 
|-id=527 bgcolor=#fefefe
| 258527 || 2002 BL || — || January 18, 2002 || Powell || Powell Obs. || FLO || align=right data-sort-value="0.64" | 640 m || 
|-id=528 bgcolor=#d6d6d6
| 258528 ||  || — || January 20, 2002 || Kitt Peak || Spacewatch || EUP || align=right | 4.9 km || 
|-id=529 bgcolor=#E9E9E9
| 258529 ||  || — || January 19, 2002 || Anderson Mesa || LONEOS || — || align=right | 3.6 km || 
|-id=530 bgcolor=#E9E9E9
| 258530 ||  || — || January 18, 2002 || Socorro || LINEAR || — || align=right | 4.9 km || 
|-id=531 bgcolor=#d6d6d6
| 258531 ||  || — || January 18, 2002 || Socorro || LINEAR || — || align=right | 2.6 km || 
|-id=532 bgcolor=#fefefe
| 258532 ||  || — || January 19, 2002 || Socorro || LINEAR || — || align=right data-sort-value="0.90" | 900 m || 
|-id=533 bgcolor=#E9E9E9
| 258533 ||  || — || January 19, 2002 || Socorro || LINEAR || — || align=right | 3.5 km || 
|-id=534 bgcolor=#d6d6d6
| 258534 ||  || — || January 21, 2002 || Socorro || LINEAR || — || align=right | 4.8 km || 
|-id=535 bgcolor=#E9E9E9
| 258535 ||  || — || January 22, 2002 || Socorro || LINEAR || INO || align=right | 1.9 km || 
|-id=536 bgcolor=#E9E9E9
| 258536 ||  || — || January 19, 2002 || Socorro || LINEAR || — || align=right | 2.8 km || 
|-id=537 bgcolor=#E9E9E9
| 258537 ||  || — || January 19, 2002 || Socorro || LINEAR || — || align=right | 2.4 km || 
|-id=538 bgcolor=#C2FFFF
| 258538 ||  || — || January 22, 2002 || Palomar || NEAT || L4 || align=right | 12 km || 
|-id=539 bgcolor=#d6d6d6
| 258539 ||  || — || February 3, 2002 || Palomar || NEAT || — || align=right | 3.7 km || 
|-id=540 bgcolor=#E9E9E9
| 258540 ||  || — || February 4, 2002 || Cima Ekar || ADAS || — || align=right | 3.4 km || 
|-id=541 bgcolor=#E9E9E9
| 258541 ||  || — || February 6, 2002 || Socorro || LINEAR || — || align=right | 4.3 km || 
|-id=542 bgcolor=#d6d6d6
| 258542 ||  || — || February 6, 2002 || Socorro || LINEAR || — || align=right | 5.5 km || 
|-id=543 bgcolor=#E9E9E9
| 258543 ||  || — || February 4, 2002 || Haleakala || NEAT || — || align=right | 4.1 km || 
|-id=544 bgcolor=#d6d6d6
| 258544 ||  || — || February 6, 2002 || Palomar || NEAT || — || align=right | 3.7 km || 
|-id=545 bgcolor=#E9E9E9
| 258545 ||  || — || February 6, 2002 || Haleakala || NEAT || GEF || align=right | 1.7 km || 
|-id=546 bgcolor=#E9E9E9
| 258546 ||  || — || February 6, 2002 || Socorro || LINEAR || — || align=right | 3.2 km || 
|-id=547 bgcolor=#E9E9E9
| 258547 ||  || — || February 6, 2002 || Socorro || LINEAR || — || align=right | 3.4 km || 
|-id=548 bgcolor=#d6d6d6
| 258548 ||  || — || February 6, 2002 || Socorro || LINEAR || — || align=right | 5.9 km || 
|-id=549 bgcolor=#E9E9E9
| 258549 ||  || — || February 4, 2002 || Haleakala || NEAT || — || align=right | 3.3 km || 
|-id=550 bgcolor=#d6d6d6
| 258550 ||  || — || February 7, 2002 || Palomar || NEAT || — || align=right | 4.4 km || 
|-id=551 bgcolor=#d6d6d6
| 258551 ||  || — || February 3, 2002 || Haleakala || NEAT || ALA || align=right | 5.7 km || 
|-id=552 bgcolor=#E9E9E9
| 258552 ||  || — || February 3, 2002 || Haleakala || NEAT || WAT || align=right | 2.7 km || 
|-id=553 bgcolor=#fefefe
| 258553 ||  || — || February 7, 2002 || Socorro || LINEAR || — || align=right data-sort-value="0.93" | 930 m || 
|-id=554 bgcolor=#E9E9E9
| 258554 ||  || — || February 7, 2002 || Socorro || LINEAR || — || align=right | 3.0 km || 
|-id=555 bgcolor=#E9E9E9
| 258555 ||  || — || February 6, 2002 || Socorro || LINEAR || GEF || align=right | 1.4 km || 
|-id=556 bgcolor=#E9E9E9
| 258556 ||  || — || February 6, 2002 || Socorro || LINEAR || — || align=right | 3.0 km || 
|-id=557 bgcolor=#d6d6d6
| 258557 ||  || — || February 6, 2002 || Socorro || LINEAR || ALA || align=right | 5.1 km || 
|-id=558 bgcolor=#d6d6d6
| 258558 ||  || — || February 7, 2002 || Socorro || LINEAR || BRA || align=right | 1.7 km || 
|-id=559 bgcolor=#E9E9E9
| 258559 ||  || — || February 7, 2002 || Socorro || LINEAR || — || align=right | 4.6 km || 
|-id=560 bgcolor=#d6d6d6
| 258560 ||  || — || February 7, 2002 || Socorro || LINEAR || KAR || align=right | 1.8 km || 
|-id=561 bgcolor=#E9E9E9
| 258561 ||  || — || February 7, 2002 || Socorro || LINEAR || — || align=right | 3.1 km || 
|-id=562 bgcolor=#d6d6d6
| 258562 ||  || — || February 7, 2002 || Socorro || LINEAR || EOS || align=right | 3.3 km || 
|-id=563 bgcolor=#E9E9E9
| 258563 ||  || — || February 7, 2002 || Socorro || LINEAR || — || align=right | 3.2 km || 
|-id=564 bgcolor=#E9E9E9
| 258564 ||  || — || February 7, 2002 || Socorro || LINEAR || — || align=right | 3.3 km || 
|-id=565 bgcolor=#d6d6d6
| 258565 ||  || — || February 7, 2002 || Socorro || LINEAR || THM || align=right | 3.2 km || 
|-id=566 bgcolor=#fefefe
| 258566 ||  || — || February 7, 2002 || Socorro || LINEAR || — || align=right data-sort-value="0.94" | 940 m || 
|-id=567 bgcolor=#C2FFFF
| 258567 ||  || — || February 7, 2002 || Socorro || LINEAR || L4 || align=right | 13 km || 
|-id=568 bgcolor=#fefefe
| 258568 ||  || — || February 7, 2002 || Socorro || LINEAR || — || align=right data-sort-value="0.98" | 980 m || 
|-id=569 bgcolor=#d6d6d6
| 258569 ||  || — || February 12, 2002 || Desert Eagle || W. K. Y. Yeung || — || align=right | 3.0 km || 
|-id=570 bgcolor=#fefefe
| 258570 ||  || — || February 7, 2002 || Socorro || LINEAR || — || align=right | 1.2 km || 
|-id=571 bgcolor=#fefefe
| 258571 ||  || — || February 7, 2002 || Socorro || LINEAR || FLO || align=right data-sort-value="0.97" | 970 m || 
|-id=572 bgcolor=#fefefe
| 258572 ||  || — || February 7, 2002 || Socorro || LINEAR || — || align=right | 1.1 km || 
|-id=573 bgcolor=#d6d6d6
| 258573 ||  || — || February 8, 2002 || Socorro || LINEAR || EOS || align=right | 2.7 km || 
|-id=574 bgcolor=#E9E9E9
| 258574 ||  || — || February 8, 2002 || Socorro || LINEAR || — || align=right | 3.6 km || 
|-id=575 bgcolor=#d6d6d6
| 258575 ||  || — || February 8, 2002 || Socorro || LINEAR || — || align=right | 5.7 km || 
|-id=576 bgcolor=#E9E9E9
| 258576 ||  || — || February 9, 2002 || Socorro || LINEAR || — || align=right | 3.0 km || 
|-id=577 bgcolor=#fefefe
| 258577 ||  || — || February 10, 2002 || Socorro || LINEAR || — || align=right data-sort-value="0.75" | 750 m || 
|-id=578 bgcolor=#E9E9E9
| 258578 ||  || — || February 10, 2002 || Socorro || LINEAR || AEO || align=right | 1.1 km || 
|-id=579 bgcolor=#d6d6d6
| 258579 ||  || — || February 10, 2002 || Socorro || LINEAR || — || align=right | 3.1 km || 
|-id=580 bgcolor=#fefefe
| 258580 ||  || — || February 8, 2002 || Kitt Peak || Spacewatch || NYS || align=right data-sort-value="0.76" | 760 m || 
|-id=581 bgcolor=#d6d6d6
| 258581 ||  || — || February 8, 2002 || Socorro || LINEAR || EOS || align=right | 6.2 km || 
|-id=582 bgcolor=#d6d6d6
| 258582 ||  || — || February 8, 2002 || Socorro || LINEAR || — || align=right | 4.7 km || 
|-id=583 bgcolor=#E9E9E9
| 258583 ||  || — || February 8, 2002 || Socorro || LINEAR || — || align=right | 3.6 km || 
|-id=584 bgcolor=#d6d6d6
| 258584 ||  || — || February 8, 2002 || Socorro || LINEAR || — || align=right | 2.4 km || 
|-id=585 bgcolor=#fefefe
| 258585 ||  || — || February 8, 2002 || Socorro || LINEAR || — || align=right | 1.0 km || 
|-id=586 bgcolor=#d6d6d6
| 258586 ||  || — || February 8, 2002 || Socorro || LINEAR || — || align=right | 5.0 km || 
|-id=587 bgcolor=#fefefe
| 258587 ||  || — || February 10, 2002 || Socorro || LINEAR || — || align=right data-sort-value="0.83" | 830 m || 
|-id=588 bgcolor=#E9E9E9
| 258588 ||  || — || February 10, 2002 || Socorro || LINEAR || — || align=right | 3.9 km || 
|-id=589 bgcolor=#d6d6d6
| 258589 ||  || — || February 10, 2002 || Socorro || LINEAR || EOS || align=right | 2.6 km || 
|-id=590 bgcolor=#fefefe
| 258590 ||  || — || February 10, 2002 || Socorro || LINEAR || — || align=right | 1.0 km || 
|-id=591 bgcolor=#d6d6d6
| 258591 ||  || — || February 10, 2002 || Socorro || LINEAR || EOS || align=right | 2.8 km || 
|-id=592 bgcolor=#d6d6d6
| 258592 ||  || — || February 10, 2002 || Socorro || LINEAR || — || align=right | 2.7 km || 
|-id=593 bgcolor=#d6d6d6
| 258593 ||  || — || February 10, 2002 || Socorro || LINEAR || EOS || align=right | 2.4 km || 
|-id=594 bgcolor=#d6d6d6
| 258594 ||  || — || February 10, 2002 || Socorro || LINEAR || KOR || align=right | 2.2 km || 
|-id=595 bgcolor=#E9E9E9
| 258595 ||  || — || February 10, 2002 || Socorro || LINEAR || — || align=right | 3.9 km || 
|-id=596 bgcolor=#E9E9E9
| 258596 ||  || — || February 10, 2002 || Socorro || LINEAR || — || align=right | 3.4 km || 
|-id=597 bgcolor=#C2FFFF
| 258597 ||  || — || February 10, 2002 || Socorro || LINEAR || L4 || align=right | 12 km || 
|-id=598 bgcolor=#fefefe
| 258598 ||  || — || February 10, 2002 || Socorro || LINEAR || — || align=right | 1.3 km || 
|-id=599 bgcolor=#d6d6d6
| 258599 ||  || — || February 6, 2002 || Palomar || NEAT || CHA || align=right | 3.0 km || 
|-id=600 bgcolor=#E9E9E9
| 258600 ||  || — || February 10, 2002 || Socorro || LINEAR || — || align=right | 2.5 km || 
|}

258601–258700 

|-bgcolor=#fefefe
| 258601 ||  || — || February 12, 2002 || Kitt Peak || Spacewatch || — || align=right data-sort-value="0.64" | 640 m || 
|-id=602 bgcolor=#d6d6d6
| 258602 ||  || — || February 13, 2002 || Palomar || NEAT || EUP || align=right | 5.8 km || 
|-id=603 bgcolor=#fefefe
| 258603 ||  || — || February 11, 2002 || Socorro || LINEAR || — || align=right data-sort-value="0.89" | 890 m || 
|-id=604 bgcolor=#d6d6d6
| 258604 ||  || — || February 3, 2002 || Cima Ekar || ADAS || — || align=right | 3.1 km || 
|-id=605 bgcolor=#fefefe
| 258605 ||  || — || February 4, 2002 || Anderson Mesa || LONEOS || — || align=right | 1.1 km || 
|-id=606 bgcolor=#E9E9E9
| 258606 ||  || — || February 4, 2002 || Palomar || NEAT || DOR || align=right | 3.0 km || 
|-id=607 bgcolor=#d6d6d6
| 258607 ||  || — || February 7, 2002 || Kitt Peak || Spacewatch || EOS || align=right | 1.9 km || 
|-id=608 bgcolor=#d6d6d6
| 258608 ||  || — || February 8, 2002 || Kitt Peak || M. W. Buie || — || align=right | 3.6 km || 
|-id=609 bgcolor=#d6d6d6
| 258609 ||  || — || February 9, 2002 || Kitt Peak || Spacewatch || — || align=right | 4.2 km || 
|-id=610 bgcolor=#d6d6d6
| 258610 ||  || — || February 10, 2002 || Socorro || LINEAR || — || align=right | 6.3 km || 
|-id=611 bgcolor=#fefefe
| 258611 ||  || — || February 12, 2002 || Socorro || LINEAR || — || align=right | 1.2 km || 
|-id=612 bgcolor=#d6d6d6
| 258612 ||  || — || February 12, 2002 || Socorro || LINEAR || EOS || align=right | 2.7 km || 
|-id=613 bgcolor=#E9E9E9
| 258613 ||  || — || February 3, 2002 || Palomar || NEAT || DOR || align=right | 3.1 km || 
|-id=614 bgcolor=#E9E9E9
| 258614 ||  || — || February 10, 2002 || Socorro || LINEAR || AGN || align=right | 1.4 km || 
|-id=615 bgcolor=#E9E9E9
| 258615 ||  || — || February 6, 2002 || Palomar || NEAT || MRX || align=right | 1.7 km || 
|-id=616 bgcolor=#d6d6d6
| 258616 ||  || — || February 13, 2002 || Palomar || NEAT || — || align=right | 4.4 km || 
|-id=617 bgcolor=#E9E9E9
| 258617 ||  || — || February 10, 2002 || Socorro || LINEAR || — || align=right | 2.6 km || 
|-id=618 bgcolor=#d6d6d6
| 258618 ||  || — || February 6, 2002 || Palomar || NEAT || — || align=right | 3.9 km || 
|-id=619 bgcolor=#d6d6d6
| 258619 ||  || — || February 6, 2002 || Palomar || NEAT || — || align=right | 4.1 km || 
|-id=620 bgcolor=#d6d6d6
| 258620 ||  || — || February 6, 2002 || Kitt Peak || M. W. Buie || — || align=right | 4.2 km || 
|-id=621 bgcolor=#C2FFFF
| 258621 ||  || — || February 14, 2002 || Kitt Peak || Spacewatch || L4 || align=right | 11 km || 
|-id=622 bgcolor=#d6d6d6
| 258622 ||  || — || February 20, 2002 || Socorro || LINEAR || HYG || align=right | 4.4 km || 
|-id=623 bgcolor=#fefefe
| 258623 ||  || — || February 22, 2002 || Palomar || NEAT || — || align=right | 1.2 km || 
|-id=624 bgcolor=#C2FFFF
| 258624 ||  || — || February 16, 2002 || Palomar || NEAT || L4 || align=right | 12 km || 
|-id=625 bgcolor=#d6d6d6
| 258625 ||  || — || February 16, 2002 || Palomar || NEAT || — || align=right | 3.2 km || 
|-id=626 bgcolor=#fefefe
| 258626 ||  || — || February 16, 2002 || Palomar || NEAT || FLO || align=right data-sort-value="0.81" | 810 m || 
|-id=627 bgcolor=#C2FFFF
| 258627 ||  || — || February 16, 2002 || Palomar || NEAT || L4 || align=right | 12 km || 
|-id=628 bgcolor=#C2FFFF
| 258628 ||  || — || February 16, 2002 || Palomar || NEAT || L4 || align=right | 13 km || 
|-id=629 bgcolor=#E9E9E9
| 258629 || 2002 EU || — || March 3, 2002 || Haleakala || NEAT || — || align=right | 2.2 km || 
|-id=630 bgcolor=#d6d6d6
| 258630 ||  || — || March 5, 2002 || Eskridge || Farpoint Obs. || — || align=right | 4.8 km || 
|-id=631 bgcolor=#C2FFFF
| 258631 ||  || — || March 11, 2002 || Palomar || NEAT || L4 || align=right | 13 km || 
|-id=632 bgcolor=#d6d6d6
| 258632 ||  || — || March 11, 2002 || Ondřejov || P. Kušnirák || — || align=right | 4.6 km || 
|-id=633 bgcolor=#d6d6d6
| 258633 ||  || — || March 9, 2002 || Socorro || LINEAR || — || align=right | 3.9 km || 
|-id=634 bgcolor=#d6d6d6
| 258634 ||  || — || March 9, 2002 || Socorro || LINEAR || — || align=right | 4.1 km || 
|-id=635 bgcolor=#fefefe
| 258635 ||  || — || March 9, 2002 || Palomar || NEAT || V || align=right data-sort-value="0.96" | 960 m || 
|-id=636 bgcolor=#fefefe
| 258636 ||  || — || March 9, 2002 || Palomar || NEAT || NYS || align=right data-sort-value="0.64" | 640 m || 
|-id=637 bgcolor=#fefefe
| 258637 ||  || — || March 9, 2002 || Palomar || NEAT || — || align=right data-sort-value="0.95" | 950 m || 
|-id=638 bgcolor=#d6d6d6
| 258638 ||  || — || March 11, 2002 || Palomar || NEAT || HYG || align=right | 3.5 km || 
|-id=639 bgcolor=#fefefe
| 258639 ||  || — || March 11, 2002 || Palomar || NEAT || — || align=right data-sort-value="0.96" | 960 m || 
|-id=640 bgcolor=#d6d6d6
| 258640 ||  || — || March 9, 2002 || Kitt Peak || Spacewatch || KOR || align=right | 2.3 km || 
|-id=641 bgcolor=#d6d6d6
| 258641 ||  || — || March 9, 2002 || Kitt Peak || Spacewatch || — || align=right | 3.2 km || 
|-id=642 bgcolor=#d6d6d6
| 258642 ||  || — || March 10, 2002 || Kitt Peak || Spacewatch || EOS || align=right | 2.2 km || 
|-id=643 bgcolor=#fefefe
| 258643 ||  || — || March 9, 2002 || Socorro || LINEAR || — || align=right | 1.2 km || 
|-id=644 bgcolor=#E9E9E9
| 258644 ||  || — || March 12, 2002 || Socorro || LINEAR || — || align=right | 2.7 km || 
|-id=645 bgcolor=#fefefe
| 258645 ||  || — || March 11, 2002 || Haleakala || NEAT || NYS || align=right data-sort-value="0.83" | 830 m || 
|-id=646 bgcolor=#C2FFFF
| 258646 ||  || — || March 12, 2002 || Kitt Peak || Spacewatch || L4 || align=right | 9.9 km || 
|-id=647 bgcolor=#fefefe
| 258647 ||  || — || March 9, 2002 || Socorro || LINEAR || NYS || align=right data-sort-value="0.79" | 790 m || 
|-id=648 bgcolor=#E9E9E9
| 258648 ||  || — || March 9, 2002 || Socorro || LINEAR || — || align=right | 2.7 km || 
|-id=649 bgcolor=#fefefe
| 258649 ||  || — || March 13, 2002 || Socorro || LINEAR || FLO || align=right data-sort-value="0.63" | 630 m || 
|-id=650 bgcolor=#d6d6d6
| 258650 ||  || — || March 13, 2002 || Socorro || LINEAR || HYG || align=right | 3.9 km || 
|-id=651 bgcolor=#d6d6d6
| 258651 ||  || — || March 13, 2002 || Socorro || LINEAR || LIX || align=right | 3.9 km || 
|-id=652 bgcolor=#fefefe
| 258652 ||  || — || March 13, 2002 || Socorro || LINEAR || — || align=right | 1.0 km || 
|-id=653 bgcolor=#fefefe
| 258653 ||  || — || March 13, 2002 || Socorro || LINEAR || — || align=right | 1.1 km || 
|-id=654 bgcolor=#fefefe
| 258654 ||  || — || March 13, 2002 || Socorro || LINEAR || NYS || align=right data-sort-value="0.78" | 780 m || 
|-id=655 bgcolor=#fefefe
| 258655 ||  || — || March 13, 2002 || Socorro || LINEAR || — || align=right | 1.5 km || 
|-id=656 bgcolor=#C2FFFF
| 258656 ||  || — || March 11, 2002 || Kitt Peak || Spacewatch || L4 || align=right | 8.0 km || 
|-id=657 bgcolor=#d6d6d6
| 258657 ||  || — || March 13, 2002 || Palomar || NEAT || — || align=right | 4.4 km || 
|-id=658 bgcolor=#d6d6d6
| 258658 ||  || — || March 9, 2002 || Socorro || LINEAR || — || align=right | 3.1 km || 
|-id=659 bgcolor=#fefefe
| 258659 ||  || — || March 14, 2002 || Socorro || LINEAR || — || align=right data-sort-value="0.98" | 980 m || 
|-id=660 bgcolor=#d6d6d6
| 258660 ||  || — || March 14, 2002 || Socorro || LINEAR || — || align=right | 3.5 km || 
|-id=661 bgcolor=#fefefe
| 258661 ||  || — || March 14, 2002 || Socorro || LINEAR || — || align=right data-sort-value="0.95" | 950 m || 
|-id=662 bgcolor=#E9E9E9
| 258662 ||  || — || March 5, 2002 || Anderson Mesa || LONEOS || — || align=right | 3.4 km || 
|-id=663 bgcolor=#E9E9E9
| 258663 ||  || — || March 5, 2002 || Haleakala || NEAT || GEF || align=right | 2.1 km || 
|-id=664 bgcolor=#fefefe
| 258664 ||  || — || March 6, 2002 || Palomar || NEAT || — || align=right data-sort-value="0.87" | 870 m || 
|-id=665 bgcolor=#fefefe
| 258665 ||  || — || March 6, 2002 || Palomar || NEAT || FLO || align=right data-sort-value="0.91" | 910 m || 
|-id=666 bgcolor=#d6d6d6
| 258666 ||  || — || March 6, 2002 || Palomar || NEAT || EUP || align=right | 4.7 km || 
|-id=667 bgcolor=#fefefe
| 258667 ||  || — || March 9, 2002 || Anderson Mesa || LONEOS || — || align=right | 1.0 km || 
|-id=668 bgcolor=#d6d6d6
| 258668 ||  || — || March 9, 2002 || Anderson Mesa || LONEOS || — || align=right | 4.8 km || 
|-id=669 bgcolor=#C2FFFF
| 258669 ||  || — || March 10, 2002 || Kitt Peak || Spacewatch || L4 || align=right | 11 km || 
|-id=670 bgcolor=#C2FFFF
| 258670 ||  || — || March 10, 2002 || Haleakala || NEAT || L4 || align=right | 12 km || 
|-id=671 bgcolor=#fefefe
| 258671 ||  || — || March 12, 2002 || Anderson Mesa || LONEOS || FLO || align=right data-sort-value="0.83" | 830 m || 
|-id=672 bgcolor=#d6d6d6
| 258672 ||  || — || March 12, 2002 || Socorro || LINEAR || — || align=right | 3.5 km || 
|-id=673 bgcolor=#d6d6d6
| 258673 ||  || — || March 12, 2002 || Palomar || NEAT || — || align=right | 4.2 km || 
|-id=674 bgcolor=#d6d6d6
| 258674 ||  || — || March 12, 2002 || Palomar || NEAT || HYG || align=right | 4.3 km || 
|-id=675 bgcolor=#fefefe
| 258675 ||  || — || March 13, 2002 || Socorro || LINEAR || — || align=right data-sort-value="0.95" | 950 m || 
|-id=676 bgcolor=#d6d6d6
| 258676 ||  || — || March 12, 2002 || Anderson Mesa || LONEOS || TIR || align=right | 3.9 km || 
|-id=677 bgcolor=#d6d6d6
| 258677 ||  || — || March 12, 2002 || Kitt Peak || Spacewatch || KAR || align=right | 1.8 km || 
|-id=678 bgcolor=#d6d6d6
| 258678 ||  || — || March 13, 2002 || Kitt Peak || Spacewatch || — || align=right | 3.5 km || 
|-id=679 bgcolor=#d6d6d6
| 258679 ||  || — || March 15, 2002 || Kitt Peak || Spacewatch || — || align=right | 3.0 km || 
|-id=680 bgcolor=#fefefe
| 258680 ||  || — || March 15, 2002 || Palomar || NEAT || FLO || align=right data-sort-value="0.86" | 860 m || 
|-id=681 bgcolor=#d6d6d6
| 258681 ||  || — || March 15, 2002 || Palomar || NEAT || — || align=right | 3.7 km || 
|-id=682 bgcolor=#d6d6d6
| 258682 ||  || — || March 13, 2002 || Socorro || LINEAR || — || align=right | 2.4 km || 
|-id=683 bgcolor=#C2FFFF
| 258683 ||  || — || March 6, 2002 || Socorro || LINEAR || L4 || align=right | 16 km || 
|-id=684 bgcolor=#C2FFFF
| 258684 ||  || — || March 13, 2002 || Palomar || NEAT || L4 || align=right | 9.9 km || 
|-id=685 bgcolor=#C2FFFF
| 258685 ||  || — || March 12, 2002 || Palomar || NEAT || L4 || align=right | 8.6 km || 
|-id=686 bgcolor=#C2FFFF
| 258686 ||  || — || March 5, 2002 || Anderson Mesa || LONEOS || L4 || align=right | 11 km || 
|-id=687 bgcolor=#fefefe
| 258687 ||  || — || March 20, 2002 || Socorro || LINEAR || — || align=right | 1.2 km || 
|-id=688 bgcolor=#E9E9E9
| 258688 ||  || — || March 16, 2002 || Haleakala || NEAT || — || align=right | 3.4 km || 
|-id=689 bgcolor=#d6d6d6
| 258689 ||  || — || March 19, 2002 || Palomar || NEAT || — || align=right | 6.7 km || 
|-id=690 bgcolor=#d6d6d6
| 258690 ||  || — || March 20, 2002 || Anderson Mesa || LONEOS || — || align=right | 3.9 km || 
|-id=691 bgcolor=#d6d6d6
| 258691 ||  || — || March 21, 2002 || Socorro || LINEAR || — || align=right | 4.3 km || 
|-id=692 bgcolor=#fefefe
| 258692 ||  || — || March 30, 2002 || Palomar || NEAT || — || align=right | 1.9 km || 
|-id=693 bgcolor=#d6d6d6
| 258693 ||  || — || March 20, 2002 || Socorro || LINEAR || — || align=right | 5.5 km || 
|-id=694 bgcolor=#fefefe
| 258694 ||  || — || April 8, 2002 || Palomar || NEAT || — || align=right | 1.4 km || 
|-id=695 bgcolor=#FA8072
| 258695 ||  || — || April 8, 2002 || Kitt Peak || Spacewatch || — || align=right data-sort-value="0.52" | 520 m || 
|-id=696 bgcolor=#fefefe
| 258696 ||  || — || April 15, 2002 || Socorro || LINEAR || — || align=right | 1.0 km || 
|-id=697 bgcolor=#fefefe
| 258697 ||  || — || April 15, 2002 || Socorro || LINEAR || — || align=right | 1.4 km || 
|-id=698 bgcolor=#C2FFFF
| 258698 ||  || — || April 7, 2002 || Cerro Tololo || M. W. Buie || L4 || align=right | 8.9 km || 
|-id=699 bgcolor=#d6d6d6
| 258699 ||  || — || April 2, 2002 || Palomar || NEAT || — || align=right | 4.7 km || 
|-id=700 bgcolor=#fefefe
| 258700 ||  || — || April 2, 2002 || Palomar || NEAT || — || align=right | 1.3 km || 
|}

258701–258800 

|-bgcolor=#fefefe
| 258701 ||  || — || April 2, 2002 || Kitt Peak || Spacewatch || FLO || align=right data-sort-value="0.84" | 840 m || 
|-id=702 bgcolor=#fefefe
| 258702 ||  || — || April 4, 2002 || Palomar || NEAT || NYS || align=right | 1.00 km || 
|-id=703 bgcolor=#fefefe
| 258703 ||  || — || April 4, 2002 || Palomar || NEAT || FLO || align=right data-sort-value="0.66" | 660 m || 
|-id=704 bgcolor=#fefefe
| 258704 ||  || — || April 5, 2002 || Anderson Mesa || LONEOS || — || align=right data-sort-value="0.89" | 890 m || 
|-id=705 bgcolor=#E9E9E9
| 258705 ||  || — || April 8, 2002 || Palomar || NEAT || — || align=right | 3.7 km || 
|-id=706 bgcolor=#fefefe
| 258706 ||  || — || April 8, 2002 || Palomar || NEAT || — || align=right data-sort-value="0.87" | 870 m || 
|-id=707 bgcolor=#fefefe
| 258707 ||  || — || April 8, 2002 || Palomar || NEAT || FLO || align=right | 1.1 km || 
|-id=708 bgcolor=#fefefe
| 258708 ||  || — || April 8, 2002 || Palomar || NEAT || V || align=right data-sort-value="0.75" | 750 m || 
|-id=709 bgcolor=#fefefe
| 258709 ||  || — || April 8, 2002 || Palomar || NEAT || — || align=right | 1.1 km || 
|-id=710 bgcolor=#fefefe
| 258710 ||  || — || April 8, 2002 || Palomar || NEAT || FLO || align=right data-sort-value="0.88" | 880 m || 
|-id=711 bgcolor=#d6d6d6
| 258711 ||  || — || April 9, 2002 || Anderson Mesa || LONEOS || EOS || align=right | 3.3 km || 
|-id=712 bgcolor=#fefefe
| 258712 ||  || — || April 9, 2002 || Anderson Mesa || LONEOS || FLO || align=right data-sort-value="0.84" | 840 m || 
|-id=713 bgcolor=#fefefe
| 258713 ||  || — || April 8, 2002 || Palomar || NEAT || — || align=right data-sort-value="0.89" | 890 m || 
|-id=714 bgcolor=#fefefe
| 258714 ||  || — || April 9, 2002 || Socorro || LINEAR || FLO || align=right data-sort-value="0.91" | 910 m || 
|-id=715 bgcolor=#d6d6d6
| 258715 ||  || — || April 10, 2002 || Kvistaberg || UDAS || 7:4 || align=right | 8.4 km || 
|-id=716 bgcolor=#d6d6d6
| 258716 ||  || — || April 10, 2002 || Socorro || LINEAR || EOS || align=right | 3.5 km || 
|-id=717 bgcolor=#d6d6d6
| 258717 ||  || — || April 10, 2002 || Socorro || LINEAR || — || align=right | 4.4 km || 
|-id=718 bgcolor=#fefefe
| 258718 ||  || — || April 10, 2002 || Socorro || LINEAR || FLO || align=right data-sort-value="0.88" | 880 m || 
|-id=719 bgcolor=#fefefe
| 258719 ||  || — || April 10, 2002 || Socorro || LINEAR || — || align=right | 1.2 km || 
|-id=720 bgcolor=#fefefe
| 258720 ||  || — || April 10, 2002 || Socorro || LINEAR || — || align=right data-sort-value="0.96" | 960 m || 
|-id=721 bgcolor=#fefefe
| 258721 ||  || — || April 10, 2002 || Socorro || LINEAR || V || align=right data-sort-value="0.94" | 940 m || 
|-id=722 bgcolor=#fefefe
| 258722 ||  || — || April 10, 2002 || Socorro || LINEAR || — || align=right | 1.1 km || 
|-id=723 bgcolor=#d6d6d6
| 258723 ||  || — || April 8, 2002 || Palomar || NEAT || — || align=right | 2.7 km || 
|-id=724 bgcolor=#fefefe
| 258724 ||  || — || April 9, 2002 || Socorro || LINEAR || V || align=right data-sort-value="0.97" | 970 m || 
|-id=725 bgcolor=#fefefe
| 258725 ||  || — || April 9, 2002 || Socorro || LINEAR || NYS || align=right data-sort-value="0.70" | 700 m || 
|-id=726 bgcolor=#fefefe
| 258726 ||  || — || April 10, 2002 || Socorro || LINEAR || — || align=right | 1.2 km || 
|-id=727 bgcolor=#d6d6d6
| 258727 ||  || — || April 10, 2002 || Socorro || LINEAR || — || align=right | 4.2 km || 
|-id=728 bgcolor=#d6d6d6
| 258728 ||  || — || April 10, 2002 || Socorro || LINEAR || — || align=right | 5.1 km || 
|-id=729 bgcolor=#d6d6d6
| 258729 ||  || — || April 11, 2002 || Socorro || LINEAR || — || align=right | 4.4 km || 
|-id=730 bgcolor=#fefefe
| 258730 ||  || — || April 11, 2002 || Socorro || LINEAR || — || align=right | 1.0 km || 
|-id=731 bgcolor=#d6d6d6
| 258731 ||  || — || April 12, 2002 || Palomar || NEAT || — || align=right | 4.3 km || 
|-id=732 bgcolor=#d6d6d6
| 258732 ||  || — || April 10, 2002 || Socorro || LINEAR || — || align=right | 4.5 km || 
|-id=733 bgcolor=#fefefe
| 258733 ||  || — || April 10, 2002 || Socorro || LINEAR || NYS || align=right | 1.0 km || 
|-id=734 bgcolor=#d6d6d6
| 258734 ||  || — || April 11, 2002 || Socorro || LINEAR || EOS || align=right | 2.7 km || 
|-id=735 bgcolor=#d6d6d6
| 258735 ||  || — || April 12, 2002 || Socorro || LINEAR || HYG || align=right | 3.8 km || 
|-id=736 bgcolor=#fefefe
| 258736 ||  || — || April 12, 2002 || Socorro || LINEAR || — || align=right | 1.1 km || 
|-id=737 bgcolor=#fefefe
| 258737 ||  || — || April 12, 2002 || Socorro || LINEAR || — || align=right data-sort-value="0.91" | 910 m || 
|-id=738 bgcolor=#fefefe
| 258738 ||  || — || April 14, 2002 || Socorro || LINEAR || — || align=right data-sort-value="0.94" | 940 m || 
|-id=739 bgcolor=#d6d6d6
| 258739 ||  || — || April 14, 2002 || Socorro || LINEAR || — || align=right | 4.8 km || 
|-id=740 bgcolor=#fefefe
| 258740 ||  || — || April 12, 2002 || Palomar || NEAT || FLO || align=right data-sort-value="0.94" | 940 m || 
|-id=741 bgcolor=#fefefe
| 258741 ||  || — || April 13, 2002 || Palomar || NEAT || — || align=right | 1.0 km || 
|-id=742 bgcolor=#fefefe
| 258742 ||  || — || April 14, 2002 || Socorro || LINEAR || V || align=right data-sort-value="0.89" | 890 m || 
|-id=743 bgcolor=#fefefe
| 258743 ||  || — || April 15, 2002 || Anderson Mesa || LONEOS || FLO || align=right data-sort-value="0.76" | 760 m || 
|-id=744 bgcolor=#fefefe
| 258744 ||  || — || April 14, 2002 || Palomar || NEAT || V || align=right data-sort-value="0.92" | 920 m || 
|-id=745 bgcolor=#fefefe
| 258745 ||  || — || April 14, 2002 || Palomar || NEAT || — || align=right | 1.1 km || 
|-id=746 bgcolor=#d6d6d6
| 258746 ||  || — || April 14, 2002 || Haleakala || NEAT || — || align=right | 5.2 km || 
|-id=747 bgcolor=#fefefe
| 258747 ||  || — || April 5, 2002 || Palomar || M. White, M. Collins || MAS || align=right data-sort-value="0.84" | 840 m || 
|-id=748 bgcolor=#fefefe
| 258748 ||  || — || April 5, 2002 || Palomar || M. White, M. Collins || — || align=right data-sort-value="0.94" | 940 m || 
|-id=749 bgcolor=#fefefe
| 258749 ||  || — || April 5, 2002 || Palomar || R. Matson || FLO || align=right data-sort-value="0.75" | 750 m || 
|-id=750 bgcolor=#fefefe
| 258750 ||  || — || April 4, 2002 || Palomar || NEAT || — || align=right data-sort-value="0.83" | 830 m || 
|-id=751 bgcolor=#fefefe
| 258751 ||  || — || April 9, 2002 || Palomar || NEAT || — || align=right data-sort-value="0.82" | 820 m || 
|-id=752 bgcolor=#d6d6d6
| 258752 ||  || — || April 12, 2002 || Palomar || NEAT || — || align=right | 2.9 km || 
|-id=753 bgcolor=#d6d6d6
| 258753 || 2002 HL || — || April 16, 2002 || Desert Eagle || W. K. Y. Yeung || — || align=right | 5.1 km || 
|-id=754 bgcolor=#fefefe
| 258754 ||  || — || April 16, 2002 || Socorro || LINEAR || — || align=right | 1.1 km || 
|-id=755 bgcolor=#d6d6d6
| 258755 ||  || — || April 16, 2002 || Socorro || LINEAR || THB || align=right | 3.7 km || 
|-id=756 bgcolor=#d6d6d6
| 258756 ||  || — || April 16, 2002 || Socorro || LINEAR || — || align=right | 5.2 km || 
|-id=757 bgcolor=#E9E9E9
| 258757 ||  || — || April 20, 2002 || Palomar || NEAT || POS || align=right | 5.2 km || 
|-id=758 bgcolor=#d6d6d6
| 258758 ||  || — || April 17, 2002 || Socorro || LINEAR || — || align=right | 3.0 km || 
|-id=759 bgcolor=#d6d6d6
| 258759 ||  || — || April 17, 2002 || Socorro || LINEAR || THM || align=right | 3.1 km || 
|-id=760 bgcolor=#d6d6d6
| 258760 ||  || — || April 17, 2002 || Socorro || LINEAR || THM || align=right | 3.1 km || 
|-id=761 bgcolor=#fefefe
| 258761 ||  || — || April 18, 2002 || Palomar || NEAT || NYS || align=right data-sort-value="0.76" | 760 m || 
|-id=762 bgcolor=#C2FFFF
| 258762 ||  || — || April 17, 2002 || Kitt Peak || Spacewatch || L4ERY || align=right | 14 km || 
|-id=763 bgcolor=#fefefe
| 258763 ||  || — || May 2, 2002 || Anderson Mesa || LONEOS || — || align=right | 1.3 km || 
|-id=764 bgcolor=#fefefe
| 258764 ||  || — || May 7, 2002 || Palomar || NEAT || FLO || align=right data-sort-value="0.72" | 720 m || 
|-id=765 bgcolor=#d6d6d6
| 258765 ||  || — || May 7, 2002 || Palomar || NEAT || — || align=right | 3.6 km || 
|-id=766 bgcolor=#d6d6d6
| 258766 ||  || — || May 7, 2002 || Palomar || NEAT || — || align=right | 4.6 km || 
|-id=767 bgcolor=#fefefe
| 258767 ||  || — || May 9, 2002 || Socorro || LINEAR || — || align=right | 1.4 km || 
|-id=768 bgcolor=#fefefe
| 258768 ||  || — || May 9, 2002 || Socorro || LINEAR || — || align=right data-sort-value="0.92" | 920 m || 
|-id=769 bgcolor=#fefefe
| 258769 ||  || — || May 9, 2002 || Socorro || LINEAR || — || align=right data-sort-value="0.99" | 990 m || 
|-id=770 bgcolor=#fefefe
| 258770 ||  || — || May 9, 2002 || Socorro || LINEAR || V || align=right data-sort-value="0.92" | 920 m || 
|-id=771 bgcolor=#fefefe
| 258771 ||  || — || May 9, 2002 || Socorro || LINEAR || NYS || align=right data-sort-value="0.82" | 820 m || 
|-id=772 bgcolor=#d6d6d6
| 258772 ||  || — || May 8, 2002 || Socorro || LINEAR || — || align=right | 4.7 km || 
|-id=773 bgcolor=#fefefe
| 258773 ||  || — || May 9, 2002 || Socorro || LINEAR || — || align=right | 1.0 km || 
|-id=774 bgcolor=#fefefe
| 258774 ||  || — || May 8, 2002 || Socorro || LINEAR || — || align=right | 1.3 km || 
|-id=775 bgcolor=#fefefe
| 258775 ||  || — || May 9, 2002 || Socorro || LINEAR || — || align=right | 1.3 km || 
|-id=776 bgcolor=#fefefe
| 258776 ||  || — || May 8, 2002 || Socorro || LINEAR || — || align=right | 1.2 km || 
|-id=777 bgcolor=#fefefe
| 258777 ||  || — || May 11, 2002 || Socorro || LINEAR || FLO || align=right data-sort-value="0.98" | 980 m || 
|-id=778 bgcolor=#d6d6d6
| 258778 ||  || — || May 11, 2002 || Socorro || LINEAR || EOS || align=right | 2.9 km || 
|-id=779 bgcolor=#d6d6d6
| 258779 ||  || — || May 11, 2002 || Socorro || LINEAR || — || align=right | 4.0 km || 
|-id=780 bgcolor=#fefefe
| 258780 ||  || — || May 11, 2002 || Socorro || LINEAR || — || align=right | 1.0 km || 
|-id=781 bgcolor=#d6d6d6
| 258781 ||  || — || May 11, 2002 || Socorro || LINEAR || — || align=right | 4.9 km || 
|-id=782 bgcolor=#d6d6d6
| 258782 ||  || — || May 11, 2002 || Socorro || LINEAR || LUT || align=right | 5.9 km || 
|-id=783 bgcolor=#d6d6d6
| 258783 ||  || — || May 11, 2002 || Socorro || LINEAR || HYG || align=right | 4.8 km || 
|-id=784 bgcolor=#d6d6d6
| 258784 ||  || — || May 15, 2002 || Nogales || Tenagra II Obs. || — || align=right | 2.8 km || 
|-id=785 bgcolor=#d6d6d6
| 258785 ||  || — || May 9, 2002 || Palomar || NEAT || — || align=right | 3.6 km || 
|-id=786 bgcolor=#fefefe
| 258786 ||  || — || May 9, 2002 || Palomar || NEAT || FLO || align=right data-sort-value="0.71" | 710 m || 
|-id=787 bgcolor=#d6d6d6
| 258787 ||  || — || May 9, 2002 || Palomar || NEAT || EOS || align=right | 2.8 km || 
|-id=788 bgcolor=#fefefe
| 258788 ||  || — || May 9, 2002 || Palomar || NEAT || MAS || align=right data-sort-value="0.86" | 860 m || 
|-id=789 bgcolor=#fefefe
| 258789 ||  || — || May 10, 2002 || Palomar || NEAT || V || align=right data-sort-value="0.90" | 900 m || 
|-id=790 bgcolor=#d6d6d6
| 258790 ||  || — || May 12, 2002 || Palomar || NEAT || — || align=right | 4.9 km || 
|-id=791 bgcolor=#d6d6d6
| 258791 ||  || — || May 13, 2002 || Palomar || NEAT || — || align=right | 5.1 km || 
|-id=792 bgcolor=#fefefe
| 258792 ||  || — || May 9, 2002 || Anderson Mesa || LONEOS || PHO || align=right | 1.3 km || 
|-id=793 bgcolor=#E9E9E9
| 258793 ||  || — || May 18, 2002 || Anderson Mesa || LONEOS || CLO || align=right | 3.6 km || 
|-id=794 bgcolor=#E9E9E9
| 258794 || 2002 LA || — || June 1, 2002 || Socorro || LINEAR || — || align=right | 4.5 km || 
|-id=795 bgcolor=#fefefe
| 258795 ||  || — || June 5, 2002 || Kitt Peak || Spacewatch || FLO || align=right data-sort-value="0.87" | 870 m || 
|-id=796 bgcolor=#d6d6d6
| 258796 ||  || — || June 5, 2002 || Socorro || LINEAR || — || align=right | 4.9 km || 
|-id=797 bgcolor=#d6d6d6
| 258797 ||  || — || June 1, 2002 || Socorro || LINEAR || — || align=right | 4.5 km || 
|-id=798 bgcolor=#fefefe
| 258798 ||  || — || June 5, 2002 || Socorro || LINEAR || — || align=right | 1.4 km || 
|-id=799 bgcolor=#fefefe
| 258799 ||  || — || June 5, 2002 || Socorro || LINEAR || — || align=right data-sort-value="0.97" | 970 m || 
|-id=800 bgcolor=#fefefe
| 258800 ||  || — || June 6, 2002 || Socorro || LINEAR || — || align=right | 1.8 km || 
|}

258801–258900 

|-bgcolor=#fefefe
| 258801 ||  || — || June 2, 2002 || Palomar || NEAT || — || align=right data-sort-value="0.89" | 890 m || 
|-id=802 bgcolor=#d6d6d6
| 258802 ||  || — || June 9, 2002 || Socorro || LINEAR || — || align=right | 4.9 km || 
|-id=803 bgcolor=#fefefe
| 258803 ||  || — || June 8, 2002 || Socorro || LINEAR || — || align=right | 1.2 km || 
|-id=804 bgcolor=#fefefe
| 258804 ||  || — || June 14, 2002 || Socorro || LINEAR || H || align=right data-sort-value="0.73" | 730 m || 
|-id=805 bgcolor=#fefefe
| 258805 ||  || — || June 10, 2002 || Palomar || NEAT || — || align=right data-sort-value="0.86" | 860 m || 
|-id=806 bgcolor=#d6d6d6
| 258806 ||  || — || June 10, 2002 || Palomar || NEAT || — || align=right | 4.3 km || 
|-id=807 bgcolor=#d6d6d6
| 258807 ||  || — || June 1, 2002 || Palomar || NEAT || — || align=right | 4.7 km || 
|-id=808 bgcolor=#FA8072
| 258808 || 2002 ME || — || June 17, 2002 || Socorro || LINEAR || — || align=right | 1.0 km || 
|-id=809 bgcolor=#fefefe
| 258809 ||  || — || July 11, 2002 || Campo Imperatore || CINEOS || NYS || align=right data-sort-value="0.80" | 800 m || 
|-id=810 bgcolor=#d6d6d6
| 258810 ||  || — || July 3, 2002 || Palomar || NEAT || — || align=right | 5.8 km || 
|-id=811 bgcolor=#fefefe
| 258811 ||  || — || July 3, 2002 || Palomar || NEAT || FLO || align=right | 1.1 km || 
|-id=812 bgcolor=#d6d6d6
| 258812 ||  || — || July 4, 2002 || Palomar || NEAT || LIX || align=right | 5.2 km || 
|-id=813 bgcolor=#fefefe
| 258813 ||  || — || July 9, 2002 || Socorro || LINEAR || — || align=right | 1.3 km || 
|-id=814 bgcolor=#fefefe
| 258814 ||  || — || July 9, 2002 || Bergisch Gladbach || W. Bickel || NYS || align=right data-sort-value="0.81" | 810 m || 
|-id=815 bgcolor=#fefefe
| 258815 ||  || — || July 9, 2002 || Socorro || LINEAR || — || align=right | 1.4 km || 
|-id=816 bgcolor=#fefefe
| 258816 ||  || — || July 9, 2002 || Socorro || LINEAR || FLO || align=right data-sort-value="0.95" | 950 m || 
|-id=817 bgcolor=#d6d6d6
| 258817 ||  || — || July 4, 2002 || Palomar || NEAT || slow || align=right | 5.5 km || 
|-id=818 bgcolor=#fefefe
| 258818 ||  || — || July 4, 2002 || Palomar || NEAT || MAS || align=right data-sort-value="0.74" | 740 m || 
|-id=819 bgcolor=#fefefe
| 258819 ||  || — || July 14, 2002 || Palomar || NEAT || MAS || align=right data-sort-value="0.66" | 660 m || 
|-id=820 bgcolor=#d6d6d6
| 258820 ||  || — || July 5, 2002 || Palomar || NEAT || — || align=right | 4.0 km || 
|-id=821 bgcolor=#fefefe
| 258821 ||  || — || July 15, 2002 || Palomar || NEAT || ERI || align=right | 1.6 km || 
|-id=822 bgcolor=#fefefe
| 258822 ||  || — || July 5, 2002 || Palomar || NEAT || NYS || align=right data-sort-value="0.78" | 780 m || 
|-id=823 bgcolor=#fefefe
| 258823 ||  || — || July 17, 2002 || Socorro || LINEAR || — || align=right | 1.4 km || 
|-id=824 bgcolor=#fefefe
| 258824 ||  || — || July 17, 2002 || Socorro || LINEAR || — || align=right | 3.0 km || 
|-id=825 bgcolor=#fefefe
| 258825 ||  || — || July 22, 2002 || Palomar || NEAT || SVE || align=right | 4.7 km || 
|-id=826 bgcolor=#fefefe
| 258826 ||  || — || July 22, 2002 || Palomar || NEAT || MAS || align=right | 1.00 km || 
|-id=827 bgcolor=#fefefe
| 258827 ||  || — || July 21, 2002 || Palomar || NEAT || H || align=right data-sort-value="0.95" | 950 m || 
|-id=828 bgcolor=#fefefe
| 258828 ||  || — || July 22, 2002 || Palomar || NEAT || V || align=right data-sort-value="0.95" | 950 m || 
|-id=829 bgcolor=#d6d6d6
| 258829 ||  || — || July 18, 2002 || Palomar || NEAT || VER || align=right | 5.2 km || 
|-id=830 bgcolor=#fefefe
| 258830 ||  || — || July 18, 2002 || Palomar || NEAT || — || align=right data-sort-value="0.79" | 790 m || 
|-id=831 bgcolor=#fefefe
| 258831 ||  || — || July 29, 2002 || Palomar || NEAT || ERI || align=right | 1.9 km || 
|-id=832 bgcolor=#fefefe
| 258832 ||  || — || August 5, 2002 || Palomar || NEAT || — || align=right | 1.1 km || 
|-id=833 bgcolor=#d6d6d6
| 258833 ||  || — || August 5, 2002 || Palomar || NEAT || — || align=right | 3.9 km || 
|-id=834 bgcolor=#fefefe
| 258834 ||  || — || August 6, 2002 || Palomar || NEAT || — || align=right | 1.1 km || 
|-id=835 bgcolor=#fefefe
| 258835 ||  || — || August 6, 2002 || Palomar || NEAT || — || align=right | 1.3 km || 
|-id=836 bgcolor=#d6d6d6
| 258836 ||  || — || August 6, 2002 || Palomar || NEAT || VER || align=right | 4.2 km || 
|-id=837 bgcolor=#fefefe
| 258837 ||  || — || August 6, 2002 || Palomar || NEAT || — || align=right | 1.2 km || 
|-id=838 bgcolor=#fefefe
| 258838 ||  || — || August 6, 2002 || Palomar || NEAT || — || align=right data-sort-value="0.89" | 890 m || 
|-id=839 bgcolor=#fefefe
| 258839 ||  || — || August 6, 2002 || Palomar || NEAT || ERI || align=right | 2.4 km || 
|-id=840 bgcolor=#fefefe
| 258840 ||  || — || August 6, 2002 || Palomar || NEAT || — || align=right | 1.1 km || 
|-id=841 bgcolor=#fefefe
| 258841 ||  || — || August 6, 2002 || Palomar || NEAT || — || align=right data-sort-value="0.93" | 930 m || 
|-id=842 bgcolor=#fefefe
| 258842 ||  || — || August 6, 2002 || Palomar || NEAT || NYS || align=right data-sort-value="0.80" | 800 m || 
|-id=843 bgcolor=#fefefe
| 258843 ||  || — || August 8, 2002 || Palomar || NEAT || — || align=right data-sort-value="0.89" | 890 m || 
|-id=844 bgcolor=#fefefe
| 258844 ||  || — || August 5, 2002 || Campo Imperatore || CINEOS || H || align=right data-sort-value="0.72" | 720 m || 
|-id=845 bgcolor=#E9E9E9
| 258845 ||  || — || August 10, 2002 || Socorro || LINEAR || — || align=right | 1.2 km || 
|-id=846 bgcolor=#fefefe
| 258846 ||  || — || August 13, 2002 || Socorro || LINEAR || NYS || align=right data-sort-value="0.98" | 980 m || 
|-id=847 bgcolor=#fefefe
| 258847 ||  || — || August 14, 2002 || Palomar || NEAT || H || align=right data-sort-value="0.92" | 920 m || 
|-id=848 bgcolor=#fefefe
| 258848 ||  || — || August 13, 2002 || Palomar || NEAT || — || align=right | 1.2 km || 
|-id=849 bgcolor=#fefefe
| 258849 ||  || — || August 13, 2002 || Palomar || NEAT || — || align=right | 1.2 km || 
|-id=850 bgcolor=#E9E9E9
| 258850 ||  || — || August 14, 2002 || Socorro || LINEAR || — || align=right | 1.8 km || 
|-id=851 bgcolor=#fefefe
| 258851 ||  || — || August 14, 2002 || Socorro || LINEAR || — || align=right | 1.5 km || 
|-id=852 bgcolor=#fefefe
| 258852 ||  || — || August 12, 2002 || Socorro || LINEAR || — || align=right | 1.3 km || 
|-id=853 bgcolor=#fefefe
| 258853 ||  || — || August 12, 2002 || Socorro || LINEAR || — || align=right | 1.1 km || 
|-id=854 bgcolor=#fefefe
| 258854 ||  || — || August 13, 2002 || Anderson Mesa || LONEOS || — || align=right | 1.2 km || 
|-id=855 bgcolor=#fefefe
| 258855 ||  || — || August 15, 2002 || Socorro || LINEAR || — || align=right | 1.4 km || 
|-id=856 bgcolor=#fefefe
| 258856 ||  || — || August 14, 2002 || Socorro || LINEAR || — || align=right data-sort-value="0.99" | 990 m || 
|-id=857 bgcolor=#E9E9E9
| 258857 ||  || — || August 12, 2002 || Socorro || LINEAR || — || align=right data-sort-value="0.86" | 860 m || 
|-id=858 bgcolor=#fefefe
| 258858 ||  || — || August 13, 2002 || Palomar || NEAT || — || align=right | 3.5 km || 
|-id=859 bgcolor=#fefefe
| 258859 ||  || — || August 12, 2002 || Socorro || LINEAR || H || align=right data-sort-value="0.70" | 700 m || 
|-id=860 bgcolor=#fefefe
| 258860 ||  || — || August 11, 2002 || Haleakala || NEAT || NYS || align=right data-sort-value="0.97" | 970 m || 
|-id=861 bgcolor=#fefefe
| 258861 ||  || — || August 8, 2002 || Palomar || S. F. Hönig || — || align=right | 1.1 km || 
|-id=862 bgcolor=#fefefe
| 258862 ||  || — || August 8, 2002 || Palomar || S. F. Hönig || — || align=right data-sort-value="0.87" | 870 m || 
|-id=863 bgcolor=#fefefe
| 258863 ||  || — || August 8, 2002 || Palomar || S. F. Hönig || — || align=right data-sort-value="0.86" | 860 m || 
|-id=864 bgcolor=#fefefe
| 258864 ||  || — || August 8, 2002 || Palomar || S. F. Hönig || MAS || align=right data-sort-value="0.74" | 740 m || 
|-id=865 bgcolor=#E9E9E9
| 258865 ||  || — || August 8, 2002 || Palomar || S. F. Hönig || — || align=right | 1.1 km || 
|-id=866 bgcolor=#fefefe
| 258866 ||  || — || August 15, 2002 || Palomar || R. Matson || V || align=right data-sort-value="0.86" | 860 m || 
|-id=867 bgcolor=#fefefe
| 258867 ||  || — || August 11, 2002 || Palomar || NEAT || NYS || align=right data-sort-value="0.98" | 980 m || 
|-id=868 bgcolor=#d6d6d6
| 258868 ||  || — || August 7, 2002 || Palomar || NEAT || HYG || align=right | 3.8 km || 
|-id=869 bgcolor=#fefefe
| 258869 ||  || — || August 11, 2002 || Palomar || NEAT || — || align=right | 2.6 km || 
|-id=870 bgcolor=#fefefe
| 258870 ||  || — || August 3, 2002 || Palomar || NEAT || — || align=right data-sort-value="0.83" | 830 m || 
|-id=871 bgcolor=#fefefe
| 258871 ||  || — || August 14, 2002 || Anderson Mesa || LONEOS || — || align=right | 1.3 km || 
|-id=872 bgcolor=#d6d6d6
| 258872 ||  || — || August 8, 2002 || Palomar || NEAT || HYG || align=right | 4.0 km || 
|-id=873 bgcolor=#fefefe
| 258873 ||  || — || August 15, 2002 || Palomar || NEAT || — || align=right | 1.2 km || 
|-id=874 bgcolor=#d6d6d6
| 258874 ||  || — || August 15, 2002 || Palomar || NEAT || — || align=right | 4.7 km || 
|-id=875 bgcolor=#fefefe
| 258875 ||  || — || August 16, 2002 || Haleakala || NEAT || NYS || align=right data-sort-value="0.81" | 810 m || 
|-id=876 bgcolor=#fefefe
| 258876 ||  || — || August 26, 2002 || Palomar || NEAT || — || align=right data-sort-value="0.91" | 910 m || 
|-id=877 bgcolor=#fefefe
| 258877 ||  || — || August 26, 2002 || Palomar || NEAT || V || align=right data-sort-value="0.80" | 800 m || 
|-id=878 bgcolor=#fefefe
| 258878 ||  || — || August 29, 2002 || Palomar || NEAT || — || align=right | 1.2 km || 
|-id=879 bgcolor=#fefefe
| 258879 ||  || — || August 29, 2002 || Palomar || NEAT || NYS || align=right data-sort-value="0.69" | 690 m || 
|-id=880 bgcolor=#fefefe
| 258880 ||  || — || August 29, 2002 || Palomar || NEAT || FLO || align=right data-sort-value="0.97" | 970 m || 
|-id=881 bgcolor=#fefefe
| 258881 ||  || — || August 30, 2002 || Kitt Peak || Spacewatch || — || align=right | 1.4 km || 
|-id=882 bgcolor=#fefefe
| 258882 ||  || — || August 30, 2002 || Palomar || NEAT || — || align=right | 1.0 km || 
|-id=883 bgcolor=#E9E9E9
| 258883 ||  || — || August 29, 2002 || Palomar || R. Matson || — || align=right | 1.0 km || 
|-id=884 bgcolor=#fefefe
| 258884 ||  || — || August 17, 2002 || Palomar || S. F. Hönig || MAS || align=right data-sort-value="0.74" | 740 m || 
|-id=885 bgcolor=#fefefe
| 258885 ||  || — || August 29, 2002 || Palomar || S. F. Hönig || NYS || align=right data-sort-value="0.64" | 640 m || 
|-id=886 bgcolor=#fefefe
| 258886 ||  || — || August 28, 2002 || Palomar || NEAT || NYS || align=right data-sort-value="0.82" | 820 m || 
|-id=887 bgcolor=#E9E9E9
| 258887 ||  || — || August 28, 2002 || Palomar || NEAT || — || align=right | 1.2 km || 
|-id=888 bgcolor=#fefefe
| 258888 ||  || — || August 30, 2002 || Palomar || NEAT || NYS || align=right data-sort-value="0.97" | 970 m || 
|-id=889 bgcolor=#fefefe
| 258889 ||  || — || August 18, 2002 || Palomar || NEAT || NYS || align=right data-sort-value="0.81" | 810 m || 
|-id=890 bgcolor=#fefefe
| 258890 ||  || — || August 30, 2002 || Palomar || NEAT || — || align=right | 2.8 km || 
|-id=891 bgcolor=#fefefe
| 258891 ||  || — || August 29, 2002 || Palomar || NEAT || — || align=right data-sort-value="0.90" | 900 m || 
|-id=892 bgcolor=#fefefe
| 258892 ||  || — || August 16, 2002 || Haleakala || NEAT || NYS || align=right data-sort-value="0.60" | 600 m || 
|-id=893 bgcolor=#E9E9E9
| 258893 ||  || — || August 28, 2002 || Palomar || NEAT || — || align=right | 1.4 km || 
|-id=894 bgcolor=#E9E9E9
| 258894 ||  || — || August 30, 2002 || Palomar || NEAT || — || align=right | 2.5 km || 
|-id=895 bgcolor=#fefefe
| 258895 ||  || — || August 18, 2002 || Palomar || NEAT || V || align=right data-sort-value="0.99" | 990 m || 
|-id=896 bgcolor=#fefefe
| 258896 ||  || — || August 30, 2002 || Palomar || NEAT || V || align=right data-sort-value="0.74" | 740 m || 
|-id=897 bgcolor=#fefefe
| 258897 ||  || — || August 16, 2002 || Palomar || NEAT || V || align=right data-sort-value="0.65" | 650 m || 
|-id=898 bgcolor=#fefefe
| 258898 ||  || — || August 16, 2002 || Haleakala || NEAT || — || align=right | 1.3 km || 
|-id=899 bgcolor=#fefefe
| 258899 ||  || — || August 19, 2002 || Palomar || NEAT || V || align=right data-sort-value="0.80" | 800 m || 
|-id=900 bgcolor=#fefefe
| 258900 ||  || — || August 17, 2002 || Palomar || NEAT || — || align=right data-sort-value="0.81" | 810 m || 
|}

258901–259000 

|-bgcolor=#fefefe
| 258901 ||  || — || August 27, 2002 || Palomar || NEAT || — || align=right data-sort-value="0.89" | 890 m || 
|-id=902 bgcolor=#E9E9E9
| 258902 ||  || — || August 29, 2002 || Palomar || NEAT || — || align=right data-sort-value="0.93" | 930 m || 
|-id=903 bgcolor=#E9E9E9
| 258903 ||  || — || August 17, 2002 || Palomar || NEAT || — || align=right | 1.1 km || 
|-id=904 bgcolor=#fefefe
| 258904 ||  || — || August 18, 2002 || Palomar || NEAT || — || align=right | 1.1 km || 
|-id=905 bgcolor=#fefefe
| 258905 ||  || — || August 28, 2006 || Kitt Peak || Spacewatch || MAS || align=right data-sort-value="0.73" | 730 m || 
|-id=906 bgcolor=#fefefe
| 258906 ||  || — || August 27, 2002 || Palomar || NEAT || V || align=right data-sort-value="0.83" | 830 m || 
|-id=907 bgcolor=#d6d6d6
| 258907 ||  || — || August 27, 2002 || Palomar || NEAT || SYL7:4 || align=right | 5.3 km || 
|-id=908 bgcolor=#fefefe
| 258908 ||  || — || August 28, 2002 || Palomar || NEAT || — || align=right data-sort-value="0.93" | 930 m || 
|-id=909 bgcolor=#fefefe
| 258909 ||  || — || August 18, 2002 || Palomar || NEAT || FLO || align=right data-sort-value="0.81" | 810 m || 
|-id=910 bgcolor=#fefefe
| 258910 ||  || — || August 30, 2002 || Palomar || NEAT || — || align=right data-sort-value="0.88" | 880 m || 
|-id=911 bgcolor=#fefefe
| 258911 ||  || — || August 29, 2002 || Palomar || NEAT || — || align=right data-sort-value="0.76" | 760 m || 
|-id=912 bgcolor=#fefefe
| 258912 ||  || — || August 30, 2002 || Palomar || NEAT || V || align=right data-sort-value="0.78" | 780 m || 
|-id=913 bgcolor=#d6d6d6
| 258913 ||  || — || August 16, 2002 || Palomar || NEAT || 3:2 || align=right | 5.0 km || 
|-id=914 bgcolor=#fefefe
| 258914 ||  || — || September 3, 2002 || Palomar || NEAT || — || align=right | 1.4 km || 
|-id=915 bgcolor=#fefefe
| 258915 ||  || — || September 4, 2002 || Palomar || NEAT || — || align=right data-sort-value="0.98" | 980 m || 
|-id=916 bgcolor=#fefefe
| 258916 ||  || — || September 4, 2002 || Anderson Mesa || LONEOS || MAS || align=right data-sort-value="0.94" | 940 m || 
|-id=917 bgcolor=#fefefe
| 258917 ||  || — || September 4, 2002 || Anderson Mesa || LONEOS || NYS || align=right data-sort-value="0.80" | 800 m || 
|-id=918 bgcolor=#fefefe
| 258918 ||  || — || September 3, 2002 || Haleakala || NEAT || — || align=right | 1.3 km || 
|-id=919 bgcolor=#E9E9E9
| 258919 ||  || — || September 5, 2002 || Anderson Mesa || LONEOS || — || align=right | 1.2 km || 
|-id=920 bgcolor=#fefefe
| 258920 ||  || — || September 5, 2002 || Socorro || LINEAR || — || align=right | 1.4 km || 
|-id=921 bgcolor=#E9E9E9
| 258921 ||  || — || September 5, 2002 || Anderson Mesa || LONEOS || — || align=right | 1.1 km || 
|-id=922 bgcolor=#E9E9E9
| 258922 ||  || — || September 5, 2002 || Socorro || LINEAR || — || align=right | 1.1 km || 
|-id=923 bgcolor=#fefefe
| 258923 ||  || — || September 5, 2002 || Socorro || LINEAR || MAS || align=right | 1.0 km || 
|-id=924 bgcolor=#fefefe
| 258924 ||  || — || September 5, 2002 || Socorro || LINEAR || NYS || align=right data-sort-value="0.86" | 860 m || 
|-id=925 bgcolor=#fefefe
| 258925 ||  || — || September 5, 2002 || Socorro || LINEAR || NYS || align=right data-sort-value="0.87" | 870 m || 
|-id=926 bgcolor=#fefefe
| 258926 ||  || — || September 5, 2002 || Socorro || LINEAR || — || align=right | 1.8 km || 
|-id=927 bgcolor=#fefefe
| 258927 ||  || — || September 3, 2002 || Palomar || NEAT || — || align=right | 1.3 km || 
|-id=928 bgcolor=#fefefe
| 258928 ||  || — || September 3, 2002 || Palomar || NEAT || — || align=right | 1.7 km || 
|-id=929 bgcolor=#fefefe
| 258929 ||  || — || September 5, 2002 || Socorro || LINEAR || MAS || align=right data-sort-value="0.89" | 890 m || 
|-id=930 bgcolor=#fefefe
| 258930 ||  || — || September 5, 2002 || Socorro || LINEAR || — || align=right | 1.1 km || 
|-id=931 bgcolor=#fefefe
| 258931 ||  || — || September 5, 2002 || Socorro || LINEAR || V || align=right data-sort-value="0.89" | 890 m || 
|-id=932 bgcolor=#fefefe
| 258932 ||  || — || September 5, 2002 || Socorro || LINEAR || V || align=right | 1.1 km || 
|-id=933 bgcolor=#fefefe
| 258933 ||  || — || September 5, 2002 || Socorro || LINEAR || NYS || align=right | 1.00 km || 
|-id=934 bgcolor=#E9E9E9
| 258934 ||  || — || September 5, 2002 || Socorro || LINEAR || — || align=right | 1.1 km || 
|-id=935 bgcolor=#fefefe
| 258935 ||  || — || September 5, 2002 || Socorro || LINEAR || — || align=right data-sort-value="0.98" | 980 m || 
|-id=936 bgcolor=#d6d6d6
| 258936 ||  || — || September 10, 2002 || Palomar || NEAT || — || align=right | 6.0 km || 
|-id=937 bgcolor=#fefefe
| 258937 ||  || — || September 10, 2002 || Palomar || NEAT || — || align=right | 1.4 km || 
|-id=938 bgcolor=#fefefe
| 258938 ||  || — || September 11, 2002 || Haleakala || NEAT || V || align=right | 1.0 km || 
|-id=939 bgcolor=#E9E9E9
| 258939 ||  || — || September 11, 2002 || Palomar || NEAT || — || align=right | 1.8 km || 
|-id=940 bgcolor=#fefefe
| 258940 ||  || — || September 11, 2002 || Palomar || NEAT || — || align=right | 1.2 km || 
|-id=941 bgcolor=#fefefe
| 258941 ||  || — || September 12, 2002 || Palomar || NEAT || V || align=right data-sort-value="0.87" | 870 m || 
|-id=942 bgcolor=#fefefe
| 258942 ||  || — || September 12, 2002 || Palomar || NEAT || V || align=right data-sort-value="0.92" | 920 m || 
|-id=943 bgcolor=#fefefe
| 258943 ||  || — || September 12, 2002 || Palomar || NEAT || NYS || align=right data-sort-value="0.65" | 650 m || 
|-id=944 bgcolor=#fefefe
| 258944 ||  || — || September 13, 2002 || Palomar || NEAT || V || align=right data-sort-value="0.92" | 920 m || 
|-id=945 bgcolor=#fefefe
| 258945 ||  || — || September 14, 2002 || Palomar || NEAT || — || align=right | 1.3 km || 
|-id=946 bgcolor=#fefefe
| 258946 ||  || — || September 14, 2002 || Palomar || NEAT || — || align=right | 1.5 km || 
|-id=947 bgcolor=#fefefe
| 258947 ||  || — || September 15, 2002 || Kitt Peak || Spacewatch || — || align=right | 1.1 km || 
|-id=948 bgcolor=#fefefe
| 258948 ||  || — || September 15, 2002 || Haleakala || NEAT || — || align=right | 1.2 km || 
|-id=949 bgcolor=#fefefe
| 258949 ||  || — || September 13, 2002 || Socorro || LINEAR || SUL || align=right | 2.4 km || 
|-id=950 bgcolor=#fefefe
| 258950 ||  || — || September 15, 2002 || Palomar || NEAT || NYS || align=right data-sort-value="0.66" | 660 m || 
|-id=951 bgcolor=#E9E9E9
| 258951 ||  || — || September 15, 2002 || Palomar || NEAT || — || align=right | 2.9 km || 
|-id=952 bgcolor=#fefefe
| 258952 ||  || — || September 15, 2002 || Haleakala || NEAT || NYS || align=right | 1.1 km || 
|-id=953 bgcolor=#d6d6d6
| 258953 ||  || — || September 11, 2002 || Palomar || M. White, M. Collins || — || align=right | 4.7 km || 
|-id=954 bgcolor=#fefefe
| 258954 ||  || — || September 9, 2002 || Haleakala || R. Matson || NYS || align=right data-sort-value="0.76" | 760 m || 
|-id=955 bgcolor=#E9E9E9
| 258955 ||  || — || September 8, 2002 || Haleakala || R. Matson || MAR || align=right | 1.4 km || 
|-id=956 bgcolor=#fefefe
| 258956 ||  || — || September 15, 2002 || Palomar || NEAT || NYS || align=right data-sort-value="0.88" | 880 m || 
|-id=957 bgcolor=#E9E9E9
| 258957 ||  || — || September 15, 2002 || Palomar || NEAT || — || align=right | 1.1 km || 
|-id=958 bgcolor=#fefefe
| 258958 ||  || — || September 15, 2002 || Palomar || NEAT || — || align=right data-sort-value="0.83" | 830 m || 
|-id=959 bgcolor=#E9E9E9
| 258959 ||  || — || September 15, 2002 || Palomar || NEAT || — || align=right | 1.1 km || 
|-id=960 bgcolor=#fefefe
| 258960 ||  || — || September 14, 2002 || Palomar || NEAT || — || align=right | 1.0 km || 
|-id=961 bgcolor=#fefefe
| 258961 ||  || — || September 26, 2002 || Palomar || NEAT || — || align=right | 1.4 km || 
|-id=962 bgcolor=#E9E9E9
| 258962 ||  || — || September 27, 2002 || Palomar || NEAT || — || align=right data-sort-value="0.89" | 890 m || 
|-id=963 bgcolor=#fefefe
| 258963 ||  || — || September 27, 2002 || Palomar || NEAT || H || align=right data-sort-value="0.63" | 630 m || 
|-id=964 bgcolor=#fefefe
| 258964 ||  || — || September 27, 2002 || Palomar || NEAT || H || align=right data-sort-value="0.80" | 800 m || 
|-id=965 bgcolor=#E9E9E9
| 258965 ||  || — || September 26, 2002 || Palomar || NEAT || — || align=right | 1.0 km || 
|-id=966 bgcolor=#E9E9E9
| 258966 ||  || — || September 27, 2002 || Palomar || NEAT || — || align=right | 1.1 km || 
|-id=967 bgcolor=#fefefe
| 258967 ||  || — || September 27, 2002 || Palomar || NEAT || MAS || align=right data-sort-value="0.94" | 940 m || 
|-id=968 bgcolor=#E9E9E9
| 258968 ||  || — || September 28, 2002 || Haleakala || NEAT || — || align=right | 2.8 km || 
|-id=969 bgcolor=#fefefe
| 258969 ||  || — || September 28, 2002 || Haleakala || NEAT || — || align=right | 1.0 km || 
|-id=970 bgcolor=#fefefe
| 258970 ||  || — || September 29, 2002 || Haleakala || NEAT || NYS || align=right data-sort-value="0.82" | 820 m || 
|-id=971 bgcolor=#E9E9E9
| 258971 ||  || — || September 29, 2002 || Haleakala || NEAT || — || align=right | 1.2 km || 
|-id=972 bgcolor=#fefefe
| 258972 ||  || — || September 30, 2002 || Socorro || LINEAR || NYS || align=right data-sort-value="0.95" | 950 m || 
|-id=973 bgcolor=#fefefe
| 258973 ||  || — || September 28, 2002 || Palomar || NEAT || H || align=right data-sort-value="0.72" | 720 m || 
|-id=974 bgcolor=#fefefe
| 258974 ||  || — || September 29, 2002 || Haleakala || NEAT || NYS || align=right data-sort-value="0.94" | 940 m || 
|-id=975 bgcolor=#fefefe
| 258975 ||  || — || September 30, 2002 || Haleakala || NEAT || — || align=right | 1.3 km || 
|-id=976 bgcolor=#fefefe
| 258976 ||  || — || September 30, 2002 || Haleakala || NEAT || — || align=right | 1.2 km || 
|-id=977 bgcolor=#E9E9E9
| 258977 ||  || — || September 27, 2002 || Palomar || NEAT || BRU || align=right | 2.7 km || 
|-id=978 bgcolor=#fefefe
| 258978 ||  || — || September 27, 2002 || Palomar || NEAT || H || align=right data-sort-value="0.55" | 550 m || 
|-id=979 bgcolor=#E9E9E9
| 258979 ||  || — || September 17, 2002 || Palomar || NEAT || — || align=right | 3.7 km || 
|-id=980 bgcolor=#E9E9E9
| 258980 ||  || — || September 26, 2002 || Palomar || NEAT || — || align=right data-sort-value="0.84" | 840 m || 
|-id=981 bgcolor=#fefefe
| 258981 ||  || — || October 1, 2002 || Anderson Mesa || LONEOS || NYS || align=right data-sort-value="0.87" | 870 m || 
|-id=982 bgcolor=#fefefe
| 258982 ||  || — || October 1, 2002 || Socorro || LINEAR || MAS || align=right | 1.2 km || 
|-id=983 bgcolor=#fefefe
| 258983 ||  || — || October 2, 2002 || Haleakala || NEAT || — || align=right | 1.0 km || 
|-id=984 bgcolor=#fefefe
| 258984 ||  || — || October 2, 2002 || Socorro || LINEAR || LCI || align=right | 1.4 km || 
|-id=985 bgcolor=#E9E9E9
| 258985 ||  || — || October 2, 2002 || Socorro || LINEAR || — || align=right | 2.0 km || 
|-id=986 bgcolor=#fefefe
| 258986 ||  || — || October 2, 2002 || Socorro || LINEAR || — || align=right | 1.4 km || 
|-id=987 bgcolor=#fefefe
| 258987 ||  || — || October 2, 2002 || Socorro || LINEAR || MAS || align=right | 1.1 km || 
|-id=988 bgcolor=#fefefe
| 258988 ||  || — || October 2, 2002 || Socorro || LINEAR || — || align=right | 1.1 km || 
|-id=989 bgcolor=#fefefe
| 258989 ||  || — || October 2, 2002 || Socorro || LINEAR || NYS || align=right data-sort-value="0.92" | 920 m || 
|-id=990 bgcolor=#E9E9E9
| 258990 ||  || — || October 2, 2002 || Socorro || LINEAR || — || align=right | 1.1 km || 
|-id=991 bgcolor=#fefefe
| 258991 ||  || — || October 2, 2002 || Socorro || LINEAR || — || align=right | 1.1 km || 
|-id=992 bgcolor=#fefefe
| 258992 ||  || — || October 2, 2002 || Socorro || LINEAR || — || align=right | 1.2 km || 
|-id=993 bgcolor=#fefefe
| 258993 ||  || — || October 2, 2002 || Socorro || LINEAR || MAS || align=right | 1.4 km || 
|-id=994 bgcolor=#fefefe
| 258994 ||  || — || October 3, 2002 || Palomar || NEAT || H || align=right data-sort-value="0.64" | 640 m || 
|-id=995 bgcolor=#fefefe
| 258995 ||  || — || October 3, 2002 || Campo Imperatore || CINEOS || — || align=right | 1.6 km || 
|-id=996 bgcolor=#fefefe
| 258996 ||  || — || October 3, 2002 || Socorro || LINEAR || — || align=right | 1.2 km || 
|-id=997 bgcolor=#E9E9E9
| 258997 ||  || — || October 7, 2002 || Haleakala || NEAT || — || align=right | 2.3 km || 
|-id=998 bgcolor=#FA8072
| 258998 ||  || — || October 8, 2002 || Haleakala || NEAT || H || align=right | 1.1 km || 
|-id=999 bgcolor=#fefefe
| 258999 ||  || — || October 1, 2002 || Anderson Mesa || LONEOS || V || align=right data-sort-value="0.99" | 990 m || 
|-id=000 bgcolor=#fefefe
| 259000 ||  || — || October 3, 2002 || Socorro || LINEAR || MAS || align=right data-sort-value="0.83" | 830 m || 
|}

References

External links 
 Discovery Circumstances: Numbered Minor Planets (255001)–(260000) (IAU Minor Planet Center)

0258